This article is designed to give background into the organization and tactics of Civil War armies. This brief survey is by no means exhaustive, but it should give enough material to have a better understanding of the capabilities of the forces that fought the American Civil War. Understanding these capabilities should give insight into the reasoning behind the decisions made by commanders on both sides.

Organization

The US Army in 1861

The Regular Army of the United States on the eve of the Civil War was essentially a frontier constabulary whose 16,000 officers and men were organized into 198 companies scattered across the nation at 79 different posts. In 1861, this Army was under the command of Brevet Lieutenant
General Winfield Scott, the 75‑year‑old hero of the Mexican‑American War. His position as general in chief was traditional, not statutory, because secretaries of war since 1821 had designated a general to be in charge of the field forces without formal congressional approval. During the course of the war, Lincoln would appoint other generals with little success until finally appointing Lieutenant General Ulysses S. Grant to the position prior to the Overland Campaign.
The field forces were controlled through a series of geographic departments whose commanders reported directly to the general in chief. This department system, frequently modified, would be used by both sides throughout the Civil War for administering regions under Army control.
Army administration was handled by a system of bureaus whose senior officers were, by 1860, in the twilight of long careers in their technical fields. Six of the 10 bureau chiefs were over 70 years old. These bureaus, modeled after the British system, answered directly to the War
Department and were not subject to the orders of the general in chief. The bureaus reflected many of today's combat support and combat service support branches; however, there was no operational planning or intelligence staff. American commanders before the Civil War had never required such a structure.
This system provided suitable civilian control and administrative support to the small field army prior to 1861. Ultimately, the bureau system would respond sufficiently, if not always efficiently, to the mass mobilization required over the next four years. Indeed, it would remain essentially intact until the early 20th century. The Confederate government, forced to
create an army and support organization from scratch, established a parallel structure to that of the US Army. In fact, many important figures in Confederate bureaus had served in the prewar Federal bureaus.

Raising armies

With the outbreak of war in April 1861, both sides faced the monumental task of organizing and equipping armies that far exceeded the prewar structure in size and complexity. The Federals maintained control of the Regular Army, and the Confederates initially created a Regular force, though in reality it was mostly on paper. Almost immediately, the North lost many of its officers to the South, including some of exceptional quality. Of 1,108 Regular Army officers serving as of 1 January 1861, 270 ultimately resigned to join the South. Only a few hundred of 15,135 enlisted men, however, left the ranks.

The federal government had two basic options for the use of the Regular Army. The government could divide the Regulars into training and leadership cadre for newly formed volunteer regiments or retain them in “pure” units to provide a reliable nucleus for the Federal Army in coming battles.

For the most part, the government opted to keep the Regulars together. During the course of the war, battle losses and disease thinned the ranks of Regulars, and officials could never recruit sufficient replacements in the face of stiff competition from the states that were forming volunteer regiments. By November 1864, many Regular units had been so depleted that
they were withdrawn from front-line service, although some Regular regiments fought with the Army of the Potomac in the Overland Campaign. In any case, the war was fought primarily with volunteer officers and men, the vast majority of whom started the war with no previous military training or experience. However, by 1864, both the Army of the Potomac and the Army of Northern Virginia were largely experienced forces that made up for a lack of formal training with three years of hard combat experience.
Neither side had difficulty in recruiting the numbers initially required to fill the expanding ranks. In April 1861, President Abraham Lincoln called for 75,000 men from the states’ militias for a three‑month period.

This figure probably represented Lincoln's informed guess as to how many troops would be needed to quell the rebellion quickly. Almost 92,000 men responded, as the states recruited their “organized” but untrained militia companies. At the First Battle of Bull Run in July 1861, these ill‑trained and poorly equipped soldiers generally fought much better than they were led. Later, as the war began to require more manpower, the federal government set enlistment quotas through various “calls,” which local districts struggled to fill. Similarly, the Confederate Congress authorized the acceptance of 100,000 one‑year volunteers in March 1861. One‑third of these men were under arms within a month. The Southern spirit of voluntarism
was so strong that possibly twice that number could have been enlisted, but sufficient arms and equipment were not then available.

As the war continued and casualty lists grew, the glory of volunteering faded, and both sides ultimately resorted to conscription to help fill the ranks. The Confederates enacted the first conscription law in American history in April 1862, followed by the federal government's own law in March 1863. Throughout these first experiments in American conscription, both sides administered the programs in less than a fair and efficient way.
Conscription laws tended to exempt wealthier citizens, and initially, draftees could hire substitutes or pay commutation fees. As a result, the average conscript maintained poor health, capability, and morale. Many eligible men, particularly in the South, enlisted to avoid the onus of being considered a conscript. Still, conscription or the threat of conscription ultimately helped provide a large number of soldiers.

Conscription was never a popular program, and the North, in particular, tried several approaches to limit conscription requirements. These efforts included offering lucrative bounties, fees paid to induce volunteers to fill required quotas. In addition, the Federals offered a series of reenlistment bonuses, including money, 30‑day furloughs, and the opportunity for veteran regiments to maintain their colors and be designated as “veteran” volunteer infantry regiments. The Federals also created an Invalid Corps (later renamed the Veteran Reserve Corps) of men unfit for front‑line service who performed essential rear area duties. In addition, the Union recruited almost 179,000 African-Americans, mostly in federally organized volunteer regiments. In the South, recruiting or conscripting slaves was so politically sensitive that it was not attempted until March 1865, far too late to influence the war.

Whatever the faults of the manpower mobilization, it was an impressive achievement, particularly as a first effort on that scale. Various enlistment figures exist, but the best estimates are that approximately two million men enlisted in the Federal Army from 1861 to 1865. Of that number, one million were under arms at the end of the war. Because the Confederate records are incomplete or lost, estimates of their enlistments vary from 600,000 to over 1.5 million. Most likely, between 750,000 and 800,000 men served the Confederacy during the war, with peak strength never exceeding 460,000 men.

The unit structure into which the expanding armies were organized was generally the same for Federals and Confederates, reflecting the common roots of both armies. The Federals began the war with a Regular Army organized into an essentially Napoleonic, musket-equipped structure. Both sides used a variant of the old Regular Army structure for newly formed volunteer regiments. The Federal War Department established a volunteer infantry regimental organization with a strength that could range from 866 to 1,046 (varying in authorized strength by up to 180 infantry privates). The Confederate Congress field its 10‑company infantry regiment at 1,045 men. Combat strength in battle, however, was always much lower (especially by the time of the Overland Campaign) because of casualties, sickness, leaves, details, desertions, and straggling.

The battery remained the basic artillery unit, although battalion and larger formal groupings of artillery emerged later in the war in the eastern theater. Four under strength Regular artillery regiments existed in the US Army at the start of the war and one Regular regiment was added in 1861, for a total of 60 batteries. Nevertheless, most batteries were volunteer organizations. For the first years of the war and part way into the Overland Campaign, a Federal battery usually consisted of six guns and had an authorized strength of 80 to 156 men. A battery of six 12‑pound Napoleons could include 130 horses. If organized as “horse” or fling artillery, cannoneers were provided individual mounts, and more horses than men could be assigned to the battery. After the battle of Spotsylvania in 1864, most of the Army of the Potomac's artillery was reorganized into four-gun batteries. Their Confederate counterparts, plagued by limited ordnance and available manpower, usually operated throughout the war with a four-gun battery, often with guns of mixed types and calibers. Confederate batteries seldom reached their initially authorized manning level of 80 soldiers.

Prewar Federal mounted units were organized into five Regular regiments (two dragoon, two cavalry, and one mounted rifle), and one Regular cavalry regiment was added in May 1861. Although the term “troop” was officially introduced in 1862, most cavalrymen continued to use the more familiar term “company” to describe their units throughout the war. The Federals grouped two companies or troops into squadrons, with four to six squadrons comprising a regiment. Confederate cavalry units, organized in the prewar model, were authorized 10 76-man companies per regiment.
Some volunteer cavalry units on both sides also formed into smaller cavalry battalions. Later in the war, both sides began to merge their cavalry regiments and brigades into division and corps organizations.

For both sides, the infantry unit structure above regimental level was similar to today's structure, with a brigade controlling three to five regiments and a division controlling two or more brigades. Federal brigades generally contained regiments from more than one state, while Confederate brigades often consisted of regiments from the same state. In the Confederate Army, a brigadier general usually commanded a brigade, and a major general commanded a division. The Federal Army, with no rank higher than major general until 1864, often had colonels commanding brigades, brigadier generals commanding divisions, and major generals commanding corps and armies. Grant received the revived rank of lieutenant general in 1864, placing him with clear authority over all of the Federal armies, but rank squabbles between the major generals appeared within the Union command structure throughout the Overland Campaign.

The large numbers of organizations formed are a reflection of the politics of the time. The War Department in 1861 considered making recruitment a Federal responsibility, but this proposal seemed to be an unnecessary expense for the short war initially envisioned. Therefore, the responsibility for recruiting remained with the states, and on both sides state governors continually encouraged local constituents to form new volunteer regiments. This practice served to strengthen support for local, state, and national politicians and provided an opportunity for glory and high rank for ambitious men. Although such local recruiting created regiments with strong bonds among the men, it also hindered filing the ranks of existing regiments with new replacements. As the war progressed, the Confederates attempted to funnel replacements into units from their same state or region, but the Federals continued to create new regiments. Existing Federal regiments detailed men back home to recruit replacements, but these efforts could never successfully compete for men joining new local regiments. The newly formed regiments thus had no seasoned veterans to train the recruits, and the battle-tested regiments lost men faster than they could recruit replacements. Many regiments on both sides (particularly for the North) were reduced to combat ineffectiveness as the war progressed. Seasoned regiments were often disbanded or consolidated, usually against the wishes of the men assigned.

The infantry regiment was the basic administrative and tactical unit of the Civil War armies. Regimental headquarters consisted of a colonel, lieutenant colonel, major, adjutant, quartermaster, surgeon (with rank of major), two assistant surgeons, a chaplain, sergeant major, quartermaster sergeant, commissary sergeant, hospital steward, and two principal musicians. Each company was staffed by a captain, a first lieutenant, a second lieutenant, a first sergeant, four sergeants, eight corporals, two musicians, and one wagoner.
The authorized strength of a Civil War infantry regiment was about 1,000 officers and men, arranged in ten companies plus a headquarters and (for the first half of the war at least) a band. Discharges for physical disability, disease, special assignments (bakers, hospital nurses, or wagoners), court-martial, and battle injuries all combined to reduce effective combat strength. Before too long a typical regiment might be reduced to less than 500. Brigades were made up of two or more regiments, with four regiments being most common. Union brigades averaged 1,000 to 1,500 men, while on the Confederate side they averaged 1,500 to 1,800. Union brigades were designated by a number within their division, and each Confederate brigade was designated by the name of its current or former commander.

Divisions were formed of two or more brigades. Union divisions contained 1,500 to 4,000 men, while the Confederate division was somewhat larger, containing 5,000 to 6,000 men. As with brigades, Union divisions were designated by a number in the Corps, while each Confederate division took the name of its current or former commander. Corps were formed of two or more divisions. The strength of a Union corps averaged 9,000 to 12,000 officers and men, those of Confederate armies might average 20,000. Two or more corps usually constituted an army, the largest operational organization. During the Civil War there were at least 16 armies on the Union side, and 23 on the Confederate side. 
In the Eastern Theater, the two principal adversaries were the Union Army of the Potomac and the Confederate Army of Northern Virginia. There were generally seven corps in the Union Army of the Potomac, although by the spring of 1864 the number was reduced to four. From the Peninsula campaign through the Battle of Antietam the Confederate Army of Northern Virginia was organized into Longstreet's and Jackson's "commands," of about 20,000 men each. In November 1862 the Confederate Congress officially designated these commands as corps. After Jackson's death in May 1863 his corps was divided in two, and thereafter the Army of Northern Virginia consisted of three corps.

Leaders

Because the organization, equipment, tactics, and training of the Confederate and Federal armies were similar, the performance of units in battle often depended on the quality and performance of their individual leaders. Both sides sought ways to find this leadership for their armies. The respective central governments appointed the general officers. At the start of the war, most, but certainly not all, of the more senior officers had West Point or other military school experience. In 1861, Lincoln appointed 126 general officers, of which 82 were or had been professionally trained officers. Jefferson Davis appointed 89, of which 44 had received professional training. The rest were political appointees, but of these only 16 Federal and 7 Confederate generals lacked military experience.

Of the lower ranking volunteer officers who comprised the bulk of the leadership for both armies, state governors normally appointed colonels (regimental commanders). States also appointed other field grade officers, although many were initially elected within their units. Company grade officers were usually elected by their men. This long‑established militia tradition, which seldom made military leadership and capability a primary consideration, was largely an extension of states’ rights and sustained political patronage in both the Union and the Confederacy.

Much has been made of the West Point backgrounds of the men who ultimately dominated the senior leadership positions of both armies, but the graduates of military colleges were not prepared by such institutions to command divisions, corps, or armies. Moreover, though many leaders had some combat experience from the Mexican War era, very few had experience above the company or battery level in the peacetime years prior to 1861. As a result, the war was not initially conducted at any level by “professional officers” in today's terminology. Leaders became more professional through experience and at the cost of thousands of lives. General William T. Sherman would later note that the war did not enter its “professional stage” until 1863. By the time of the Overland Campaign, many officers, though varying in skill, were at least comfortable at commanding their formations.

Civil War Staffs
In the Civil War, as today, the success of large military organizations and their commanders often depended on the effectiveness of the commanders’ staffs. Modern staff procedures have evolved only gradually with the increasing complexity of military operations. This evolution was far from complete in 1861, and throughout the war, commanders personally handled many vital staff functions, most notably operations and intelligence. The nature of American warfare up to the mid-19th century did not seem to overwhelm the capabilities of single commanders. However, as the Civil War progressed the armies grew larger and the war effort became a more complex undertaking and demanded larger staffs. Both sides only partially adjusted to the new demands, and bad staff work hindered operations for both the Union and Confederate forces in the Overland Campaign.

Civil War staffs were divided into a “general staff” and a “staff corps.” This terminology, defined by Winfield Scott in 1855, differs from modern definitions of the terms. Except for the chief of staff and aides-de-camp, who were considered personal staff and would often depart when a commander was reassigned, staffs mainly contained representatives of the various bureaus, with logistical areas being best represented. Later in the war, some truly effective staffs began to emerge, but this was the result of the increased experience of the officers serving in those positions rather than a comprehensive development of standard staff procedures or guidelines.

Major General George B. McClellan, when he appointed his father‑in‑law,  was  the  first  to  officially  use  the  title  “chief  of staff.” Even though many senior commanders had a chief of staff, this position was not used in any uniform way and seldom did the man in this role achieve the central coordinating authority of the chief of staff in a modern headquarters. This position, along with most other staff positions, was used as an individual commander saw fit, making staff responsibilities somewhat different under each commander. This inadequate use of the chief of staff was among the most important shortcomings of staffs during the Civil War. An equally important weakness was the lack of any formal operations or intelligence staff. Liaison procedures were also ill-defined, and various staff officers or soldiers performed this function with little formal guidance. Miscommunication or lack of knowledge of friendly units proved disastrous time after time in the war's campaigns.

Armies at Vicksburg

Major General Ulysses S. Grant's Army of the Tennessee was organized into four infantry corps. Major General Stephen A. Hurlbut's XVI Corps, however, remained headquartered in Memphis performing rear-area missions throughout the campaign, although nearly two divisions did join Grant during the siege. The remaining three corps, containing ten divisions with over 44,000 effectives, composed Grant's maneuver force during the campaign. Although some recently recruited "green" regiments participated, the bulk of Grant's army consisted of veteran units, many of which had fought with distinction at Forts Henry and Donelson, Shiloh, and Chickasaw Bayou. Of Grant's senior subordinates, the XV Corps commander, Major General William T. Sherman, was his most trusted. Ultimately to prove an exceptional operational commander, Sherman was an adequate tactician with considerable wartime command experience. He and Major General James B. McPherson, commander of XVII Corps, were West Pointers. McPherson was young and inexperienced, but both Grant and Sherman felt he held great promise. Grant's other corps commander, Major General John A. McClernand, was a prewar Democratic congressman who had raised much of his XIII Corps specifically so that he could command an independent Vicksburg expedition. A self-serving and politically ambitious man who neither enjoyed nor curried Grant's favor, he nonetheless was an able organizer and tactical commander who had served bravely at Shiloh. The division commanders were a mix of trained regular officers and volunteers who formed a better-than-average set of Civil War commanders.

Lieutenant General John C. Pemberton, a Pennsylvania-born West Pointer who had served with Jefferson Davis in the Mexican War, resigned his federal commission to join the South at the start of the war. Pemberton's army in the Vicksburg campaign consisted of five infantry divisions with no intermediate corps headquarters. Counting two brigades that briefly joined Pemberton's command during the maneuver campaign, he had over 43,000 effectives, many of whom had only limited battle experience. Of Pemberton's subordinates, Brigadier General John S. Bowen, a West Point classmate of McPherson's, was an exceptionally able tactical commander. Major General Carter L. Stevenson was also West Point trained, and the other division commander in the maneuver force, Major General William W. Loring, was a prewar Regular colonel who had worked his way up through the ranks. Significantly, none of these three men had any real respect for their commander and would prove to be less than supportive of him. Pemberton's other division commanders, Major Generals Martin L. Smith and John H. Fomey, both West Pointers, would remain in or near the city, commanding Vicksburg's garrison troops throughout the campaign.

Although Pemberton's five divisions represented the main Confederate force in the Vicksburg campaign, his army came under the jurisdiction of a higher headquarters, General Joseph E. Johnston's Department of the West. Johnston, in 1861, had been the Quartermaster General of the Regular Army and one of only five serving general officers. He had commanded in the eastern theater early in the war until severely wounded. In November 1862 after several months of convalescence, he assumed departmental command in the west. Johnston assumed direct command in Mississippi on 13 May 1863 but was unable to establish effective control over Pemberton's forces. When Pemberton became besieged in Vicksburg, Johnston assembled an Army of Relief but never seriously threatened Grant.

Morale of the troops was a serious concern for both the Union and Confederate commanders. Grant's army suffered terribly from illness in the early months of the campaign, which it spent floundering in the Louisiana swamps. But the men recovered quickly once they gained the high ground across the river. Inured to hardship, these men were served by able commanders and hardworking staffs. Once movements started, morale remained high, despite shortfalls in logistical support. Pemberton's men, although not always well served by their commanders, fought hard for their home region through the battle of Champion Hill. Although they briefly lost their resolve after that defeat, once behind the formidable works at Vicksburg, they regained a level of morale and effectiveness that only began to erode weeks later when they were faced with ever-increasing Federal strength and their own supply shortages.

Armies in the Overland Campaign
The forces in the Overland Campaign evolved through several organizational changes over the course of the two-month struggle. The details of these changes are covered in the campaign overview and in the appendixes. Some key aspects of these organizations are summarized below.

On the Union side, Lieutenant General Ulysses S. Grant, in addition to being the commander of all of the Union forces arrayed against the Confederacy, commanded all Union forces in the eastern theater of operations that fought in the Overland Campaign. His main force was Major General George G. Meade's Army of the Potomac, which initially consisted of three infantry corps and one cavalry corps. An additional infantry corps, the IX Corps under Major General Ambrose E. Burnside, began the campaign as a separate corps reporting directly to Grant, but was later assigned to the Army of the Potomac. Major General Franz Sigel commanded a Union army in the Shenandoah Valley that had only an indirect role in the Overland Campaign. On the other hand, Major General Benjamin F. Butler's Army of the James was more directly involved in the campaign. His army consisted of two infantry corps and about a division's worth of cavalry troops. Later in the campaign, at Cold Harbor, one of Butler's corps, the XVIII under Major General William F. Smith, was temporarily attached to the Army of the Potomac. The initial strength of the Army of the Potomac and the IX Corps at the beginning of the Overland Campaign was slightly under 120,000 men.

There are some factors affecting the strength, quality, and organization of the Union forces that should be noted. First, just prior to the campaign, the Army of the Potomac had abolished two of its infantry corps (the I and III Corps, both of which had been decimated at Gettysburg) and consolidated their subordinate units into the remaining three corps (II, V, and VI). This definitely streamlined the Army's command and control, but it also meant that some divisions and brigades were not accustomed to their new corps’ methods and procedures at the start of the campaign. Second, soldiers in a large number of the Federal regiments were approaching the expiration dates of their enlistments just as the campaign was set to begin in May 1864. Most of the troops in these regiments had enlisted for three years in 1861, and they represented the most experienced fighters in the Army. A surprisingly large number of these soldiers reenlisted (over 50 percent), but there was still a large turnover and much disruption as many of the regiments that reenlisted returned to their home states for furloughs and to recruit replacements. Finally, the Union did tap a new source for soldiers in 1864: the “heavy artillery” regiments. These were units designed to man the heavy artillery in the fortifications around Washington, DC. Grant decided to strip many of these regiments from the forts and use them as infantry in the 1864 campaign, and he employed these forces more extensively as his losses accumulated. The heavy artillery regiments had a slightly different structure than the traditional infantry regiments, and they had not suffered battle casualties; thus, they often still possessed about 1,200 soldiers in a regiment. This was as large as a veteran Union brigade in 1864.

On the Confederate side, there was no overall commander in chief or even a theater commander with authority similar to that of Grant. Officially, only President Jefferson Davis had the authority to coordinate separate Confederate armies and military districts. However, the commander of the Army of Northern Virginia, General Robert E. Lee, had considerable influence over affairs in the entire eastern theater due to the immense respect he had earned from Davis and other Confederate leaders. Lee's army consisted of three infantry corps and a cavalry corps. One of these corps (Lieutenant General James Longstreet's I Corps) had been on detached duty just prior to the opening of the campaign and would not join the rest of Lee's army until the second day of the battle of the Wilderness

(6 June). Additional Confederate forces in the theater included Major General John C. Breckinridge's small army in the Shenandoah Valley and General P.G.T. Beauregard's forces protecting Richmond, southern Virginia, and northern North Carolina. In the course of the campaign, Lee received some reinforcements from both Breckinridge and Beauregard. The Army of Northern Virginia (including Longstreet's I Corps) began the campaign with about 64,000 soldiers.
Although plagued by an overall shortage in numbers, Lee had fewer worries about the organization and quality of his manpower. Most of his soldiers had enlisted for the duration of the war, thus his army lost few regiments due to expired terms of service. Also, thanks to its better replacement system, Confederate regiments were usually closer to a consistent strength of 350 to 600 men instead of the wild disparity of their Union counterparts (as low as 150 soldiers in the decimated veteran regiments and as much as 1,200 in the heavy artillery regiments). Overall, Lee could count on the quality and consistency of his units, and he did not have to endure the turmoil of troop turnover and organizational changes that hindered Grant's forces.

As for staffs, on the Union side Grant maintained a surprisingly small staff for a commander in chief. His personal chief of staff was Major General John A. Rawlins, a capable officer who generally produced concise and well‑crafted orders. In addition, he was Grant's alter ego, a trusted friend who took it upon himself to keep Grant sober. In fact, recent scholarship indicates that Grant's drinking was far less of a problem than formerly indicated, and there were certainly no drinking difficulties during the Overland Campaign. The rest of Grant's small staff consisted of a coterie of friends who had earned Grant's trust from their common service in the western theater campaigns. In general, this staff performed well, although a few glaring mistakes would come back to haunt the Union effort. Of course, one of the major reasons Grant could afford to keep such a small staff in the field was that the chief of staff for the Union armies, Major General Henry W. Halleck, remained in Washington with a large staff that handled Grant's administrative duties as general in chief. In fact, Halleck was a superb staff officer who tactfully navigated the political seas of Washington and gave Grant the freedom to accompany the Army of the Potomac in the field.

In contrast to Grant's field staff, Meade had a huge staff that Grant once jokingly described as fitting for an Imperial Roman Emperor. Meade's chief of staff was Major General Andrew A. Humphreys, an extremely capable officer who only reluctantly agreed to leave field command to serve on the army's staff. Humphreys has received some criticism for not pushing the Army of the Potomac through the Wilderness on 4 May; but for most of the campaign, his orders were solid and his movement plan for the crossing of the James River was outstanding. Another excellent officer on the army staff was the chief of artillery, Major General Henry J. Hunt. Recognized as one of the war's foremost experts on artillery, Hunt had a more active role in operational matters than most artillery chiefs who usually just performed administrative duties. The rest of Meade's staff was of mixed quality. In addition, the poor caliber of Union maps coupled with some mediocre young officers who were used as guides repeatedly led to misdirected movements and lost time.

Compared to Meade's large headquarters, Lee maintained a smaller group of trusted subordinates for his staff. Lee did not have a chief of staff, thus much of the responsibility for writing his orders fell on the shoulders of a few personal aides and secretaries, especially Lieutenant Colonel Charles Marshall. Lee employed several young officers, such as Lieutenant Colonel Walter Taylor and Colonel Charles S. Venable, as aides, and had great faith in these men to transmit his orders to subordinates. However, the lack of a true staff to ease his workload probably took its toll on Lee who was ill and physically exhausted by the time of the North Anna battles at the end of May. Other than his young aides, Lee had several other staff officers of mixed quality. His chief of artillery, Brigadier General William N. Pendleton, was mediocre at best, and the Army commander usually relegated his chief of artillery to strictly administrative duties. On the other hand, Major General Martin Luther (M.L.) Smith, Lee's chief engineer, played an active and generally positive role throughout the campaign.

Weapons

Infantry

During the 1850s, in a technological revolution of major proportions, the rifle musket began to replace the relatively inaccurate smoothbore musket in ever-increasing numbers, both in Europe and America. This process, accelerated by the Civil War, ensured that the rifled shoulder weapon would be the basic weapon used by infantrymen in both the Federal and Confederate armies.
The standard and most common shoulder weapon used in the American Civil War was the Springfield .58‑caliber rifle musket, models 1855, 1861, and 1863.  In  1855,  the  US  Army  adopted  this  weapon  to replace the
.69‑caliber smoothbore musket and the .54‑caliber rifle. In appearance, the rifle musket was similar to the smoothbore musket. Both were single‑shot muzzleloaders, but the rifled bore of the new weapon substantially increased its range and accuracy. The rifling system chosen by the United States was designed by Claude Minié, a French Army officer. Whereas earlier rifles fired a round nonexpanding ball, the Minié system used a    hollow‑based cylindro‑conoidal projectile slightly smaller than the bore that dropped easily into the barrel. When the powder charge was ignited by a fulminate of mercury percussion cap, the released powder gases expanded the base of the bullet into the rifled grooves, giving the projectile a ballistic spin.

The model 1855 Springfield rifle musket was the first regulation arm to use the hollow‑base .58‑caliber minie bullet. The slightly modified model 1861 was the principal infantry weapon of the Civil  War, although two subsequent models in 1863 were produced in about equal quantities. The model 1861 was 56 inches long overall, had a 40‑inch barrel, and weighed 9 pounds 2 ounces with its bayonet. The 21-inch socket bayonet consisted of an 18‑inch triangular blade and 3‑inch socket. The Springfield had a rear sight graduated to 500 yards. The maximum effective range of this weapon was approximately 500 yards, although it had killing power at 1,000 yards. The round could penetrate 11 inches of white-pine board at 200 yards and 3¼ inches at 1,000 yards, with a penetration of 1 inch considered the equivalent of disabling a human being. Although the new weapons had increased accuracy and effectiveness, the soldiers’ vision was still obscured by the clouds of smoke produced by the rifle musket's black powder propellant.

To load a muzzle‑loading rifle, the soldier took a paper cartridge in hand and tore the end of the paper with his teeth. Next, he poured the powder down the barrel and placed the bullet in the muzzle. Then, using a metal ramrod, he pushed the bullet firmly down the barrel until seated. He then cocked the hammer and placed the percussion cap on the cone or nipple, which, when struck by the hammer, ignited the gunpowder. The average rate of fire was three rounds per minute. A well‑trained soldier could possibly load and fire four times per minute, but in the confusion of battle, the rate of fire was probably slower, two to three rounds per minute.

In addition to the Springfields, over 100 types of muskets, rifles, rifle muskets, and rifled muskets—ranging up to .79 caliber—were used during the American Civil War. The numerous American-made weapons were supplemented early in the conflict by a wide variety of imported models.   The best, most popular, and most common of the foreign weapons was the British .577‑caliber Enfield rifle, model 1853, which was 54 inches long (with a 39‑inch barrel), weighed 8.7 pounds (9.2 with the bayonet), could be fitted with a socket bayonet with an 18-inch blade, and had a rear sight   graduated to 800 yards. The Enfield design was produced in a variety of forms, both long and short barreled, by several British manufacturers and at least one American company. Of all the foreign designs, the Enfield most closely resembled the Springfield in characteristics and capabilities. The United States purchased over 436,000 Enfield‑pattern weapons during the war. Statistics on Confederate purchases are more difficult to ascertain, but a report dated February 1863 indicated that 70,980 long Enfields and 9,715 short Enfields had been delivered by that time, with another 23,000 awaiting delivery.

While the quality of imported weapons varied, experts considered the Enfields and the Austrian Lorenz rifle muskets to be very good. However, some foreign governments and manufacturers took advantage of the huge initial demand for weapons by dumping their obsolete weapons on the American market. This practice was especially prevalent with some of  the older smoothbore muskets and converted flintlocks. The greatest challenge, however, lay in maintaining these weapons and supplying ammunition and replacement parts for calibers ranging from .44 to .79. The quality of the imported weapons eventually improved as the procedures, standards, and astuteness of the purchasers improved. For the most part, the European suppliers provided needed weapons, and the newer foreign weapons were highly regarded.

Breechloaders and repeating rifles were available by 1861 and were initially purchased in limited quantities, often by individual soldiers. Generally, however, these types of rifles were not issued to troops in large numbers because of technical problems (poor breech seals, faulty ammunition), fear by the Ordnance Department that the troops would waste ammunition, and the cost of rifle production. The most famous of the breechloaders was the single-shot Sharps, produced in both carbine and rifle models. The model 1859 rifle was .52‑caliber, 47⅛ inches long, and weighed 8¾ pounds, while the carbine was .52‑caliber, 39⅛ inches long, and weighed 7¾ pounds. Both weapons used a linen cartridge and  a pellet primer feed mechanism. Most Sharps carbines were issued to Federal cavalry units.

The best known of the repeaters was probably the seven‑shot .52‑caliber Spencer, which came in both rifle and carbine models. The rifle was 47‑ inches long and weighed 10 pounds, while the carbine was 39‑inches long and weighed 8¼ pounds. The Spencer was also the first weapon adopted by the US Army that fired a metallic rim‑fire, self‑contained cartridge. Soldiers loaded rounds through an opening in the butt of the stock, which fed into the chamber through a tubular magazine by the action of the trigger guard. The hammer still had to be cocked manually before each shot. The Henry rifle was, in some ways, even better than either the Sharps or the Spencer. Although never adopted by the US Army in any quantity, it was purchased privately by soldiers during the war. The Henry was a 16‑shot, .44‑caliber rimfire cartridge repeater. It was 43½ inches long and weighed  9¼  pounds. The tubular magazine located directly beneath the barrel had a 15‑round capacity with an additional round in the chamber. Of the approximately 13,500 Henrys produced, probably 10,000 saw limited service. The government purchased only 1,731.
The Colt repeating rifle, model 1855 (or revolving carbine), also was available to Civil War soldiers in limited numbers. The weapon was produced in several lengths and calibers, the lengths varying from 32 to 42½ inches, while its calibers were .36, .44, and .56. The .36 and .44 calibers were made to chamber six shots, while the .56‑caliber was made to chamber five shots. The Colt Firearms Company was also the primary supplier of revolvers (the standard sidearm for  cavalry  troops  and officers), the
.44‑caliber Army revolver and the .36‑caliber Navy revolver being the most popular (over 146,000 purchased). This was because they were simple, relatively sturdy, and reliable.

TYPICAL CIVIL WAR SMALL ARMS

Cavalry

Initially armed with sabers and pistols (and in one case, lances), Federal cavalry troops quickly added the breech-loading carbine to their inventory of weapons. Troops preferred the easier-handling carbines to rifles and the breechloaders to awkward muzzleloaders. Of the single‑shot breech-loading carbines that saw extensive use during the Civil  War, the  Hall  .52‑caliber  accounted for approximately 20,000 in 1861. The Hall was quickly replaced by a variety of more state-of-the-art carbines, including the Merrill .54‑caliber (14,495), Maynard .52‑caliber (20,002), Gallager .53‑caliber (22,728), Smith .52‑caliber (30,062), Burnside .56‑ caliber  (55,567),  and  Sharps  .54‑caliber  (80,512).  The next step in the evolutionary process was the repeating carbine, the favorite by 1864 (and commonly distributed by 1865) being the Spencer .52‑caliber seven‑shot repeater (94,194).
Because of the South's limited industrial capacity, Confederate cavalrymen had a more difficult time arming themselves. Nevertheless, they too embraced the firepower revolution, choosing shotguns and muzzle-loading carbines as well as multiple sets of revolvers as their primary weapons. In addition, Confederate cavalrymen made extensive use of battlefield salvage by recovering Federal weapons. However, the South's difficulties in producing the metallic‑rimmed cartridges required by many of these recovered weapons limited their usefulness.

Field artillery

In 1841, the US Army selected bronze as the standard material for fieldpieces and at the same time adopted a new system of field artillery. The 1841 field artillery system consisted entirely of smoothbore muzzleloaders: 6‑ and 12‑pound guns; 12‑, 24‑, and 32‑pound howitzers; and 12-pound mountain howitzers. A pre-Civil War battery usually consisted of six fieldpieces—four guns and two howitzers. A 6‑pound battery contained four M1841 6-pounder field guns and two M1841 12-pounder howitzers, while a 12-pound battery had four 12-pound guns and two 24-pound howitzers. The guns fired solid shot, shell, spherical case, grapeshot, and canister rounds, while howitzers fired shell, spherical case, grapeshot, and canister rounds (artillery ammunition is described below).

The 6‑pound gun (effective range 1,523 yards) was the primary fieldpiece used from the time of the Mexican War until the Civil War. By 1861, however, the 1841 artillery system based on the 6-pounder was obsolete. In 1857, a new and more versatile fieldpiece, the 12‑pounder Napoleon gun‑howitzer, model 1857, appeared on the scene. Designed as a multipurpose piece to replace existing guns and howitzers, the Napoleon fired canister and shell, like the 12-pound howitzer, and solid shot comparable in range to the 12-pound gun. The Napoleon was a bronze, muzzle-loading smoothbore with an effective range of 1,619 yards (see table 3 for a comparison of artillery data). Served by a nine‑man crew, the piece could fire at a sustained rate of two aimed shots per minute. Like almost all smoothbore artillery, the Napoleon fired “fixed” ammunition—the projectile and powder were bound together with metal bands.

Another new development in field artillery was the introduction of rifling. Although rifled guns provided greater range and accuracy, smoothbores were generally more reliable and faster to load. Rifled ammunition was semifixed, so the charge and the projectile had to be loaded separately. In addition, the canister load of the rifle did not perform as well as that of the smoothbore. Initially, some smoothbores were rifled on the James pattern, but they soon proved unsatisfactory because the bronze rifling eroded too easily. Therefore, most rifled artillery was either wrought iron or cast iron with a wrought-iron reinforcing band.
The most commonly used rifled guns were the 10‑pounder Parrott rifle and the Rodman, or 3‑inch Ordnance rifle. The Parrott rifle was a cast‑iron piece, easily identified by the wrought‑iron band reinforcing the breech. The 10-pound Parrott was made in two models: model 1861 had a 2.9-inch rifled bore with three lands and grooves and a slight muzzle swell, while model 1863 had a 3‑inch bore and no muzzle swell.  The  Rodman or Ordnance rifle was a long‑tubed, wrought‑iron piece that had a 3‑inch bore with seven lands and grooves. Ordnance rifles were sturdier and considered superior in accuracy and reliability to the 10-pounder Parrott.

A new weapon that made its first appearance in the war during the Overland Campaign was the 24-pound Coehorn mortar. Used exclusively by the North, the Coehorn fired a projectile in a high arcing trajectory and was ideal for lobbing shells into trenches in siege warfare. The Coehorn was used briefly during the fighting at the “bloody angle” at Spotsylvania and later in the trench lines at Cold Harbor.

By 1860, the ammunition for field artillery consisted of four general types for both smoothbores and rifles: solid shot, shell, case, and canister.  Solid shot was a round cast‑iron projectile for smoothbores and an elongated projectile, known as a bolt, for rifled guns. Solid shot, with its smashing or battering effect, was used in a counterbattery role or against buildings and massed formations.  The conical-shaped bolt lacked the effectiveness of the cannonball because it tended to bury itself on impact instead of bounding along the ground like a bowling ball.

Shell, also known as common or explosive shell, whether spherical or conical, was a hollow projectile filled with an explosive charge of black powder that was detonated by a fuse. Shell was designed to break into jagged pieces, producing an antipersonnel effect, but the low‑order detonation seldom produced more than three to five fragments. In addition to its casualty-producing effects, shell had a psychological impact when it exploded over the heads of troops. It was also used against field fortifications and in a counterbattery role. Case shot or Shrapnel shell for both smoothbore and rifled guns was a hollow projectile with thinner walls than shell. The projectile was filled with round lead or iron balls set in a matrix of sulfur that surrounded a small bursting charge. Case was primarily used in an antipersonnel role. This type of round had been invented by Henry Shrapnel, a British artillery officer, hence the term “shrapnel.”

Last, there was canister shot, probably the most effective round and the round of choice at close range ( or less) against massed troops. Canister was essentially a tin can filled with iron balls packed in sawdust with no internal bursting charge. When fired, the can disintegrated, and the balls followed their own paths to the target. The canister round for the 12‑pound Napoleon consisted of 27 1½‑inch iron balls packed inside an elongated tin cylinder. At extremely close ranges, men often loaded double charges of canister. By 1861, canister had replaced grapeshot in the ammunition chests of field batteries (grapeshot balls were larger than canister, and thus fewer could be fired per round).

During the firing sequence cannoneers took their positions as in the diagram below. At the command “Commence firing,” the gunner ordered “Load.” While the gunner sighted the piece,
Number 1 sponged the bore; Number 5 received a round from Number 7 at the limber and carried the round to Number 2, who placed it in the bore. Number 1 rammed the round to the breech, while Number 3 placed a thumb over the vent to prevent premature detonation of the charge. When the gun was loaded and sighted, Number 3 inserted a vent pick into the vent and punctured the cartridge bag. Number 4 attached a lanyard to a friction primer and inserted the primer into the vent. At the command “Fire,” Number 4 yanked the lanyard. Number 6 cut the fuses, if necessary. The process was repeated until the command to cease firing was given.

Artillery projectiles

Four basic types of projectiles were employed by Civil War field artillery:

SOLID PROJECTILE: Round (spherical) projectiles of solid iron for smooth-bores are
commonly called "cannonballs" or just plain "shot." When elongated for rifled weapons, the
projectile is known as a "bolt." Shot was used against opposing batteries, wagons, buildings,
etc., as well as enemy personnel. While round shot could ricochet across open ground against
advancing infantry and cavalry, conical bolts tended to bury themselves upon impact with the
ground and therefore were not used a great deal by field artillery.

SHELL: The shell, whether spherical or conical, was a hollow iron projectile filled with a
black powder bursting charge. It was designed to break into several ragged fragments.
Spherical shells were exploded by fuses set into an opening in the shell, and were ignited by
the flame of the cannon's propelling discharge. The time of detonation was determined by
adjusting the length of the fuse. Conical shells were detonated by similar timed fuses, or by
impact. Shells were intended to impact on the target.

CASE SHOT: Case shot, or "shrapnel" was the invention of Henry Shrapnel, an English
artillery officer. The projectile had a thinner wall than a shell and was filled with a number
of small lead or iron balls (27 for a 12-pounder). A timed fuse ignited a small bursting
charge which fragmented the casing and scattered the contents in the air. Spherical case shot
was intended to burst from fifty to seventy-five yards short of the target, the fragments being
carried forward by the velocity of the shot.

CANISTER: Canister consisted of a tin cylinder in which was packed a number of small
iron or lead balls. Upon discharge the cylinder split open and the smaller projectiles fanned
out. Canister was an extremely effective anti-personnel weapon at ranges up to 200 yards,
and had a maximum range of 400 yards. In emergencies double loads of canister could be
used at ranges of less than 200 yards, using a single propelling charge.

Siege artillery

The 1841 artillery system listed eight types of siege artillery and another six types as seacoast artillery. The 1861  Ordnance Manual included eleven different kinds of siege ordnance. The principal siege weapons in 1861 were the 4.5-inch rifle; 18-, and 24-pounder guns; a 24-pounder howitzer and two types of 8-inch howitzers; and several types of 8- and 10-inch mortars. The normal rate of fire for siege guns and mortars was about twelve rounds per hour, but with a well-drilled crew, this could probably be increased to about twenty rounds per hour. The rate of fire for siege howitzers was somewhat lower, being about eight shots per hour.

The carriages for siege guns and howitzers were longer and heavier than field artillery carriages but were similar in construction. The 24-pounder model 1839 was the heaviest piece that could be moved over the roads of the day. Alternate means of transport, such as railroad or watercraft, were required to move larger pieces any great distance.

The rounds fired by siege artillery were generally the same as those fired by field artillery, except that siege artillery continued to use grapeshot after it was discontinued in the field artillery (1841). A "stand of grape" consisted of nine iron balls, ranging from two to about three and one-half inches in size depending on the gun caliber.

The largest and heaviest artillery pieces in the Civil War era belonged to the seacoast artillery. These large weapons were normally mounted in fixed positions. The 1861 system included five types of columbiads, ranging from 8- to 15-inch; 32- and 42-pounder guns; 8- and 10-inch howitzers; and mortars of 10- and 13-inches.

Wartime additions to the Federal seacoast artillery inventory included Parrott rifles, ranging from 6.4-inch to 10-inch (300-pounder). New columbiads, developed by Ordnance Lieutenant
Thomas J. Rodman, included 8-inch, 10-inch, and 15-inch models. The Confederates produced some new seacoast artillery of their ownBrooke rifles in 6.4-inch and 7-inch versions. They also imported weapons from England, including 7- and 8-inch Armstrong rifles, 6.3-tol2.5-inch Blakely rifles, and 5-inch Whitworth rifles.

Seacoast artillery fired the same projectiles as siege artillery but with one addition - hot shot. As its name implies, hot shot was solid shot heated in special ovens until red-hot, then carefully loaded and fired as an incendiary round.

Naval ordnance

Like the Army, the U.S. Navy in the Civil War possessed an artillery establishment that spanned the spectrum from light to heavy. A series of light boat guns and howitzers corresponded to the Army's field artillery. Designed for service on small boats and launches, this class of weapon included 12- and 24-pounder pieces, both smoothbore and rifled. The most successful boat gun was a 12-pounder smoothbore howitzer (4.62-inch bore) designed by John A. Dahlgren, the Navy's premier ordnance expert and wartime chief of ordnance. Typically mounted in the bow of a small craft, the Dahlgren 12-pounder could be transferred, in a matter of minutes, to an iron field carriage for use on shore. This versatile little weapon fired shell and case rounds.

Naturally, most naval artillery was designed for ship killing. A variety of 32-pounder guns (6.4-inch bore) produced from the 1820s through the 1840s remained in service during the Civil War. These venerable smoothbores, direct descendants of the broadside guns used in the Napoleonic Wars, fired solid shot and were effective not only in ship-to-ship combat but also in the shore-bombardment role.

A more modern class of naval artillery weapons was known as "shellguns." These were large-caliber smoothbores designed to shoot massive exploding shells that were capable of dealing catastrophic damage to a wooden-hulled vessel. Shellguns could be found both in broadside batteries and in upper-deck pivot mounts, which allowed wide traverse. An early example of the shellgun, designed in 1845 but still in service during the Civil War, was an 8-inch model that fired a 51-pound shell.

John Dahlgren's design came to typify the shellgun class of weapons. All of his shellguns shared an unmistakable "beer-bottle" shape. The most successful Dahlgren shellguns were a 9-inch model (72.5-pound shell or 90-pound solid shot), an 11-inch (136-pound shell or 170-pound solid shot), and a 15-inch, which fired an awesome 330-pound shell or 440-pound solid shot. A pivot-mounted 11-inch shellgun proved to be the decisive weapon in the U.S.S. Kearsarge's 1864 victory over the C.S.S. Alabama. The famous U.S. Navy ironclad Monitor mounted two 11-inch Dahlgrens in its rotating turret. Later monitors carried 15-inch shellguns.

The U.S. Navy also made wide use of rifled artillery. These high-velocity weapons became increasingly important with the advent of ironclad warships. Some Navy rifles were essentially identical to Army models. For instance, the Navy procured Parrott rifles in 4.2-inch, 6.4-inch, 8-inch, and 10-inch versions, each of which had a counterpart in the Army as either siege or seacoast artillery. Other rifled weapons, conceived specifically for naval use, included two Dahlgren designs. The 50-pounder (with approximately 5-inch bore) was the better of the two Dahlgren rifles. An 80-pounder model (6-inch bore) was less popular, due to its tendency to burst.

The Confederacy relied heavily on British imports for its naval armament Naval variants of Armstrong, Whitworth, and Blakely weapons all saw service. In addition, the Confederate Navy used Brooke rifles manufactured in the South. The Confederacy also produced a 9-inch version of the Dahlgren shellgun that apparently found use both afloat and ashore.

Weapons at Vicksburg
The wide variety of infantry weapons available to Civil War armies is clearly evident at Vicksburg. A review of the Quarterly Returns of Ordnance for April-June 1863 reveals that approximately three-quarters of Grant's Army of the Tennessee carried "first class" shoulder weapons, the most numerous of which were British 1853 Enfield rifle-muskets (.577 caliber). Other "first class" weapons used in the Vicksburg campaign included American-made Springfield rifle-muskets (.58 caliber), French rifle-muskets (.58 caliber), French "light" or "Liege" rifles (.577 caliber), U.S. Model 1840/45 rifles (.58 caliber), Dresden and Suhl rifle-muskets (.58 caliber), and Sharps breechloading carbines (.52 caliber). Approximately thirty-five Federal regiments (roughly one-quarter of the total) were armed primarily with "second class" weapons, such as Austrian rifle-muskets in .54, .577, and .58 calibers; U.S. Model 1841 rifled muskets (.69 caliber); U.S. Model 1816 rifled muskets altered to percussion (.69 caliber); Belgian and French rifled muskets (.69 and .71 calibers); Belgian or Vincennes rifles (.70 and .71 calibers); and both Austrian and Prussian rifled muskets in .69 and .70 calibers. Only one Federal regiment, the 101st Illinois Infantry, was armed with "third class" weapons, such as the U.S. Model 1842 smoothbore musket (.69 caliber), Austrian, Prussian, and French smoothbore muskets (.69 caliber), and Austrian and Prussian smoothbore muskets of.72 caliber. After the surrender of Vicksburg, the 101 st Illinois, along with about twenty regiments armed with "second class" arms, exchanged its obsolete weapons for captured Confederate rifle-muskets.

Although the Confederate records are incomplete, it seems that some 50,000 shoulder weapons were surrendered at Vicksburg, mostly British-made Enfields. Other weapons included a mix of various .58-caliber "minié" rifles (Springfield, Richmond, Mississippi and Fayetteville models), Austrian and French rifle-muskets in .577 and .58 calibers, Mississippi rifles, Austrian rifle-muskets (.54 caliber), various .69-caliber rifled muskets altered to percussion, Belgian .70-caliber rifles, and British smoothbore muskets in .75 caliber.

The diversity of weapons (and calibers of ammunition) obviously created serious sustainment problems for both sides. Amazingly, there is little evidence that ammunition shortages had much influence on operations (the Vicksburg defenders surrendered 600,000 rounds and 350,000 percussion caps), even though the lack of weapons standardization extended down to regimental levels.

Whereas there was little to differentiate Union from Confederate effectiveness so far as small arms were concerned, the Union forces at Vicksburg enjoyed a clear superiority in terms of artillery. When Grant's army closed on Vicksburg to begin siege operations, it held about 180 cannon. At the height of its strength during the siege, the Union force included some forty-seven batteries of artillery for a total of 247 guns-13 "heavy" guns and 234 "field" pieces. Twenty-nine of the Federal batteries contained six guns each; the remaining eighteen were considered four-gun batteries. Smoothbores outnumbered rifles by a ratio of roughly two to one.

No account of Union artillery at Vicksburg would be complete without an acknowledgment of the U.S. Navy's contributions. Porter's vessels carried guns ranging in size from 12-pounder howitzers to 11-inch Dahlgren shellguns. The Cairo, which is on display today at Vicksburg, suggests both the variety and the power of naval artillery in this campaign. When she sank in December 1862, the Cairo went down with three 42-pounder (7-inch bore) Army rifles, three 64-pounder (8-inch bore) Navy smoothbores, six 32-pounder (6.4-inch bore) Navy smoothbores, and one 4.2-inch 30-pounder Parrott rifle. Porter's firepower was not restricted to the water. During the siege, naval guns served ashore as siege artillery.

The Confederates possessed a sizeable artillery capability but could not match Federal firepower. Taken together, the Confederate forces under Pemberton and Johnston possessed a total of about 62 batteries of artillery with some 221 tubes. Pemberton's force besieged in Vicksburg included 172 cannon-approximately 103 fieldpieces and 69 siege weapons. Thirty-seven of the siege guns, plus thirteen fieldpieces, occupied positions overlooking the Mississippi. (The number of big guns along the river dropped to thirty-one by the end of the siege-apparently some weapons were shifted elsewhere.) The thirteen field pieces were distributed along the river to counter amphibious assault. The heavy ordnance was grouped into thirteen distinct river-front batteries. These large river-defense weapons included twenty smoothbores, ranging in size from 32-pounder siege guns to 10-inch Columbiads, and seventeen rifled pieces, ranging from a 2.75-inch Whitworth to a 7.44-inch Blakely.

In most of the engagements during the Vicksburg campaign, the Union artillery demonstrated its superiority to that of the Confederates. During the siege, that superiority grew into dominance. The Confederates scattered their artillery in one- or two-gun battery positions sited to repel Union assaults. By declining to mass their guns, the Confederates could do little to interfere with Union siege operations. By contrast, Union gunners created massed batteries at critical points along the line. These were able both to support siege operations with concentrated fires and keep the Confederate guns silent by smothering the embrasures of the small Confederate battery positions. As the siege progressed, Confederate artillery fire dwindled to ineffective levels, whereas the Union artillery blasted away at will. As much as any other factor, Union fire superiority sealed the fate of the Confederate army besieged in Vicksburg.

Weapons in the Overland Campaign
The variety of weapons available to both armies during the Civil War is reflected in the battles of the Overland Campaign. To a limited extent, the Army of Northern Virginia's infantry had more uniformity in its small arms than the Army of the Potomac. In fact, some regiments of the famous Pennsylvania Reserves Brigade were still equipped with smoothbore muskets. In any case, both armies relied heavily on the Springfield and Enfield, which were the most common weapons used (although almost every other type of Civil War small arms could be found in the campaign).
The variety of weapons and calibers of ammunition required on the battlefield by each army presented sustainment challenges that ranged from production and procurement to supplying soldiers in the field. Amazingly, operations were not often affected by the need to resupply a diverse mixture of ammunition types.

The Army of the Potomac (including the IX Corps) started the campaign with 58 batteries of artillery. Of these, 42 were six‑gun batteries, while the other 16 batteries were of the four-gun type. The Federals went to a four-gun battery system after the battle of Spotsylvania. Also at this time, the Army of the Potomac's Artillery Reserve was disbanded except for the ammunition train. The Reserve's batteries went to the corps‑level reserve artillery brigades. The Army of Northern Virginia totaled 56 artillery batteries. The vast majority of these (42) were four‑gun batteries. The rest of the mix included one six‑gun battery, three five‑gun, five three‑gun, four two‑gun, and a lone one‑gun battery. (Refer to table 3 for the major types of artillery available to the two armies at the start of the campaign.)

The effectiveness of artillery during the campaign was mixed. In the Wilderness, the rugged terrain and the dense vegetation reduced the effectiveness of artillery fire. Specifically, the Federals’ advantage in numbers of longer‑range rifled guns was negated by the lack of good fields of fire. The more open ground at Spotsylvania and Cold Harbor allowed for better use of artillery. However, the increasing use of entrenchments on both sides tended to relegate artillery to a defensive role.

The Confederates tended to keep their batteries decentralized, usually attached to the infantry brigades within the divisions to which they were assigned. Lee's army did not have an artillery reserve. The Union tended to centralize their artillery, even after disbanding the army-level reserve. This often meant keeping reserve batteries at corps-level, other batteries in division reserves, and occasionally assigning batteries to brigades as needed.
In the Overland Campaign, the Confederate cavalry had an advantage over its Union counterpart in reconnaissance and screening missions. This was largely due to personalities and the mission focus of the two sides, rather than to any organizational or tactical differences between them. The Army of the Potomac's cavalry corps was commanded by Major General Philip H. Sheridan, who clashed with the Army  commander,  Meade, over the role of the cavalry. After the opening of the Spotsylvania fight, Sheridan got his wish and conducted a large raid toward Richmond. Stuart countered with part of his force, but the remaining Confederate cavalry kept Lee well informed while the Federals were almost blind. Stuart was killed at the battle of Yellow Tavern, but his eventual replacement, Major General Wade Hampton, filled in admirably. Later in the war, Sheridan would make better use of the cavalry as a striking force, but he never really mastered its reconnaissance role.

Tactics

First year tactics
The Napoleonic Wars and the Mexican War were the major influences on American military thinking at the beginning of the Civil War. American military leaders knew of the Napoleonic driven theories of Jomini, while tactical doctrine reflected the lessons learned in Mexico (1846‑48). However, these tactical lessons were misleading, because in Mexico relatively small armies fought only seven pitched battles. In addition, these battles were so small that almost all the tactical lessons learned during the war focused at the regimental, battery, and squadron levels. Future Civil War leaders had learned very little about brigade, division, and corps maneuvers in Mexico, yet these units were standard fighting elements of both armies in 1861–65.

The US Army's experience in Mexico validated many Napoleonic principles—particularly that of the offensive. In Mexico, tactics did not differ greatly from those of the early 19th century. Infantry marched in columns and deployed into lines to fight. Once deployed, an infantry regiment might send one or two companies forward as skirmishers, as security against surprise, or to soften the enemy's line. After identifying the enemy's position, a regiment advanced in closely ordered lines to within 100 yards. There it delivered a devastating volley, followed by a charge with bayonets. Both sides attempted to use this basic tactic in the first battles of the Civil War with tragic results.

In Mexico, American armies employed artillery and cavalry in both offensive and defensive battle situations. In the offense, artillery moved as near to the enemy lines as possible—normally just outside musket range— in order to blow gaps in the enemy's line that the infantry might exploit with a determined charge. In the defense, artillery blasted advancing enemy lines with canister and withdrew if the enemy attack got within musket range. Cavalry guarded the army's flanks and rear but held itself ready to charge if enemy infantry became disorganized or began to withdraw.
These tactics worked perfectly well with the weapons technology of the Napoleonic and Mexican Wars. The infantry musket was accurate up to 100 yards, but ineffective against even massed targets beyond that range. Rifles were specialized weapons with excellent accuracy and range but slow to load and, therefore, not usually issued to line troops. Smoothbore cannon had a range up to 1 mile with solid shot, but were most effective against infantry when firing canister at ranges under 400 yards (and even better at 200 yards or less). Artillerists worked their guns without much fear of infantry muskets, which had a limited range. Cavalry continued to use sabers and lances as shock weapons.

American troops took the tactical offensive in most Mexican War battles with great success, and they suffered fairly light losses. Unfortunately, similar tactics proved to be obsolete in the Civil War in part because of the innovation of the rifle musket. This new weapon greatly increased the infantry's range and accuracy and loaded as fast as a musket. By the beginning of the Civil War, rifle muskets were available in moderate numbers. It was the weapon of choice in both the Union and Confederate armies during the war; by 1864, the vast majority of infantry troops on both sides had rifle muskets of good quality.

Official tactical doctrine prior to the beginning of the Civil War did not clearly recognize the potential of the new rifle musket. Prior to 1855, the most influential tactical guide was General Winfield Scott's three‑volume work, Infantry Tactics (1835), based on French tactical models of the Napoleonic Wars. It stressed close-order,  linear formations in two or three ranks advancing at “quick time” of 110 steps (86 yards) per minute. In 1855, to accompany the introduction of the new rifle musket, Major William J. Hardee published a two‑volume tactical manual, Rifle and Light Infantry Tactics. Hardee's work contained few significant revisions of Scott's manual. His major innovation was to increase the speed of the advance to a “double‑quick time” of 165 steps (151 yards) per minute. If, as suggested, Hardee introduced his manual as a response to the rifle musket, then he failed to appreciate the weapon's full impact on combined arms tactics and the essential shift that the rifle musket made in favor of the defense.  Hardee's Rifle and Light Infantry Tactics was the standard infantry manual used by both sides at the outbreak of war in 1861.
If Scott's and Hardee's works lagged behind technological innovations, at least the infantry had manuals to establish a doctrinal basis for training. Cavalry and artillery fell even further behind in recognizing the potential tactical shift in favor of rifle‑armed infantry. The cavalry's manual, published in  1841, was based on French sources that focused on close-order offensive tactics. It favored the traditional cavalry attack in two ranks of horsemen armed with sabers or lances. The manual took no notice of the rifle musket's potential, nor did it give much attention to dismounted operations. Similarly, the artillery had a basic drill book delineating individual crew actions, but it had no tactical manual. Like cavalrymen, artillerymen showed no  concern for the potential tactical changes that the rifle musket implied.

Early tactics
In the battles of 1861 and 1862, both sides employed the tactics proven in Mexico and found that the tactical offensive could still occasionally be successful—but only at a great cost in casualties. Men wielding rifled weapons in the defense generally ripped incoming frontal assaults to shreds, and if the attackers paused to exchange fire, the slaughter was even greater. Rifles also increased the relative number of defenders that could engage an attacking formation, since flanking units now engaged assaulting troops with a murderous enfilading fire. Defenders usually crippled the first assault line before a second line of attackers could come forward in support. This caused successive attacking lines to intermingle with survivors to their front, thereby destroying formations, command, and control. Although both sides occasionally used the bayonet throughout the war, they quickly discovered that rifle musket fire made successful bayonet attacks almost impossible.

As the infantry troops found the bayonet charge to be of little value against rifle muskets, cavalry and artillery troops made troubling discoveries of their own. Cavalry troops learned that the old-style saber charge did not work against infantry armed with rifle muskets. Cavalry troops, however, continued their traditional intelligence gathering and screening roles and often found their place as the “eyes and ears” of the army. Artillery troops, on their part, found that they could not maneuver in the offense to canister range as they had in Mexico, because the rifle musket was accurate beyond that distance. Worse yet, at ranges where gunners were safe from rifle fire, artillery shot and shell were far less effective than canister at close range. Ironically, rifled cannon did not give the equivalent boost to artillery effectiveness that the rifle‑musket gave to the infantry. The increased range of cannons proved no real advantage in the broken and wooded terrain over which so many Civil War battles were fought.

There are several possible reasons why Civil War commanders continued to employ the tactical offensive long after it was clear that the defense was superior. Most commanders believed the offensive was the decisive form of battle. This lesson came straight from the Napoleonic wars and the Mexican‑American War. Commanders who chose the tactical offensive usually retained the initiative over defenders. Similarly, the tactical defensive depended heavily on the enemy choosing to attack at a point convenient to the defender and continuing to attack until badly defeated. Although this situation occurred often in the Civil War, a prudent commander could  hardly count on it for victory. Consequently, few commanders chose to exploit the defensive form of battle if they had the option to attack.

The offensive may have been the decisive form of battle, but it was very hard to coordinate and even harder to control. The better generals often tried to attack the enemy's flanks and rear, but seldom achieved success because of the difficulty involved. Not only did the commander have to identify the enemy's flank or rear correctly, he also had to move his force into position to attack and then do so in conjunction with attacks made by other friendly units. Command and control of the type required to conduct these attacks was quite beyond the ability of most Civil War commanders. Therefore, Civil War armies repeatedly attacked each other frontally, with resulting high casualties, because that was the easiest way to conduct offensive operations. When attacking frontally, a commander had to choose between attacking on a broad front or a narrow front. Attacking on a broad front rarely succeeded except against weak and scattered defenders. Attacking on a narrow front promised greater success but required immediate reinforcement to continue the attack and achieve decisive results. As the war dragged on, experiments with attacking forces on narrow fronts against specific objectives were attempted (Upton at Spotsylvania), but no single offensive doctrine emerged as a key to success.

Later war tactics
Poor training may have contributed to high casualty rates early in the war, but casualties remained high and even increased long after the armies became experienced. Continued high casualty rates resulted because tactical developments failed to adapt to the new weapons technology. Few commanders understood how the rifle musket strengthened the tactical defensive. However, some commanders made offensive innovations that met with varying success. When an increase in the pace of advance did not overcome defending firepower (as Hardee suggested it would), some units tried advancing in more open order. But this sort of formation lacked the appropriate mass to assault and carry prepared positions and created command and control problems beyond the ability of Civil War leaders to resolve.

Late in the war, when the difficulty of attacking field fortifications under heavy fire became apparent, other tactical expedients were employed. Attacking solidly entrenched defenders often required whole brigades and divisions moving in dense masses to rapidly cover intervening ground, seize the objective, and prepare for the inevitable counterattack. Seldom successful against alert and prepared defenses, these attacks were generally accompanied by tremendous casualties and foreshadowed the massed infantry assaults of World War I. Sometimes, large formations attempted mass charges over short distances without halting to fire. This tactic enjoyed limited success at the Spotsylvania Court House in May 1864, but generally failed to break a prepared enemy. At Spotsylvania, a Union task-organized division (under Colonel Emory Upton) attacked and captured an exposed portion of the Confederate line. The attack succeeded in part because the Union troops crossed the intervening ground very quickly and without stopping to fire their rifles. Once inside the Confederate defenses, the Union troops attempted to exploit their success by continuing their advance, but loss of command and control made them little better than a mob. Counterattacking Confederate units, in conventional formations, eventually forced the Federals to relinquish much of the ground gained.

As the war dragged on, tactical maneuver focused more on larger formations: brigade, division, and corps. In most of the major battles fought after 1861, brigades were employed as the primary maneuver formations. But brigade maneuver was at the upper limit of command and control for most Civil War commanders at the beginning of the war. Brigades might be able to retain coherent formations if the terrain were suitably open, but often brigade attacks degenerated into a series of poorly coordinated regimental lunges through broken and wooded terrain. Thus, brigade commanders were often on the main battle line trying to influence regimental fights. Typically, defending brigades stood in the line of battle and blazed away at attackers as rapidly as possible. Volley fire usually did not continue beyond the first round. Most of the time, soldiers fired as soon as they were ready, and it was common for two soldiers to work together, one loading for the other to fire. Brigades were generally invulnerable to attacks on their front if units to the left and right held their ground.

Two or more brigades comprised a division. When a division attacked, its brigades often advanced in sequence, from left to right or vice versa, depending on terrain, suspected enemy location, and number of brigades available to attack. At times, divisions attacked with two or more brigades leading, followed by one or more brigades ready to reinforce the lead brigades or maneuver to the flanks. Two or more divisions comprised a corps that might conduct an attack as part of a larger plan controlled by the army commander. More often, groups of divisions attacked under the control of a corps‑level commander. Division and corps commanders generally took a position to the rear of the main line in order to control the flow of reinforcements into the battle, but they often rode forward into the battle lines to influence the action personally.
Of the three basic branches, cavalry made the greatest adaptation during the war. It learned to use its horses for mobility, then dismount and fight on foot like infantry. Cavalry regained a useful battlefield role by employing this tactic, especially after repeating and breech‑loading rifles gave it the firepower to contend with enemy infantry. Still the most effective role for the cavalry was in reconnaissance and security in overall support of the main armies’ operations. On the other hand, many cavalry leaders were enamored with using their troops in large-scale raids, often as a pretext for seeking out the enemy's cavalry for a  decisive battle. In many cases, raids failed to produce either desired result: a decisive defeat of the enemy cavalry or significant destruction of enemy supply and transportation systems. During the Overland Campaign, Sheridan attempted a raid that ultimately led to the Battle of Yellow Tavern and, by chance, the death of Jeb Stuart. However, this raid effectively left the Army of the Potomac blind for two weeks during the campaign.

Artillery found that it could add its firepower to the rifle musket and tip the balance even more in favor of the tactical defensive, but artillery never regained the importance to offensive maneuver that it held in Mexico. If artillery had developed an indirect firing system, as it did prior to World War I, it might have been able to contribute more to offensive tactics. Still, both sides employed artillery effectively in defensive situations throughout the war.

The most significant tactical innovation in the Civil War was the widespread use of field fortifications after armies realized the tactical offensive's heavy cost. It did not take long for the deadly firepower of the rifle musket to convince soldiers to entrench every time they halted. Eventually, armies dug complete trenches within an hour of halting in a position. Within 24 hours, armies could create defensive works that were nearly impregnable to frontal assaults. The Overland Campaign, probably more than any other campaign in the Civil War, demonstrated the efficacy of field entrenchments. Both sides, particularly the numerically inferior Confederates, made extensive use of entrenchments at every battle in the campaign. In this respect, the development of field fortifications during the American Civil War was a clear forerunner of the kind of trench warfare that came to dominate World War I.

Summary of tactics
In the Civil War, the tactical defense dominated the tactical offense because assault formations proved inferior to the defender's firepower. The rifle musket, in its many forms, provided this firepower and caused the following specific alterations in tactics during the war:
 It required the attacker, in his initial dispositions, to deploy farther away from the defender, thereby increasing the distance over which the attacker had to pass.
 It increased the number of defenders who could engage attackers (with the addition of effective enfilading fire).
 It generally reduced the density of both attacking and defending formations, although in the 1864 campaigns, there was some experimentation of narrower and denser attacking formations to try to penetrate entrenched lines.
 It created a shift of emphasis in infantry battles toward  firefights rather than shock attacks.
 It caused battles to last longer, because units could not close with each other for decisive shock action.
 It encouraged the widespread use of field fortifications. The habitual use of field fortifications by armies was a major innovation, but it further hindered the tactical offensive.
 It forced cavalry to the battlefield's fringes until cavalrymen acquired equivalent weapons and tactics, although cavalry still performed essential reconnaissance missions.
 It forced artillery to abandon its basic offensive  maneuver, that of moving forward to within canister range of defending infantry.

Tactics in the Vicksburg Campaign

The basic unit of operational maneuver for Union forces in the Vicksburg campaign was the corps. For the Confederates, it was the division (there being no corps echelon in Pemberton's order of battle). On the battlefield, the brigade was the basic tactical unit for both sides. (One obvious exception to this rule was the battle of Raymond, where the Confederate force was a single brigade, and the brigade commander deployed and maneuvered regiments.)

Union forces held the initiative at the operational level throughout the campaign. Not surprisingly, in most tactical encounters, Union forces were on the offensive. Union commanders relied heavily on frontal attacks-neither Grant nor his subordinates were noted for their tactical finesse. Frontal assaults in the Civil War were generally costly, but they sometimes worked, as the Vicksburg campaign demonstrates. At the battle of Port Gibson, the Union corps commander who ran the battle, Major General John A. McClernand, enjoyed a heavy numerical advantage over the Confederates, but rugged terrain and jungle-like vegetation greatly facilitated the defense. McClernand responded by packing his forces two, three, and four regiments deep, on whatever open ground was available-crowding out his artillery in the process.

Whether this was a conscious adaptation to circumstances or a blind urge on McClernand's part to gather more and more force is a matter of speculation. Although McClernand's men eventually drove the Confederates from the field in a series of frontal attacks, Port Gibson does not stand out as an example of effective offensive tactics.

Undoubtedly, the most successful frontal attack of the campaign occurred during the battle of the Big Black River on 17 May. Brigadier General Michael K. Lawler, a Union brigade commander, perceived a weak spot in the Confederate fieldworks opposing him. He formed his brigade into a formation reminiscent of the assault columns used by Napoleon: two regiments leading, with a third following closely in support, a fourth in reserve, and two regiments on loan from another brigade to pin the enemy with fire and serve as an exploitation force. Lawler utilized natural cover to bring his brigade close to the enemy, and when the attack came, it was vigorous and impetuous. The unsteady Confederate regiment facing Lawler broke and ran when this assault force reached its breastworks.

The Napoleonic influence can be seen on a larger scale as well. During the Union march from Port Gibson to Jackson, and then to Champion Hill, Grant deployed his corps on separate routes to facilitate movement, but close enough to support each other should Confederates be encountered in force. Napoleon referred to this practice as the battalion carré, which can best be summarized by the adage, "march dispersed, fight massed." As he closed on the Confederates at Champion Hill on 16 May, Grant contrived to bring three converging corps-size columns to bear upon the enemy in a classic "concentric attack." The outnumbered Confederates could have been attacked from three directions and possibly destroyed, but Union command, control, and communications were inadequate to the task of coordinating the action. Only one of the three Union columns ever became fully engaged.

But if Union tactical art was mediocre on average, Confederate skill was generally lower still. The Confederate forces defending Mississippi constituted a "department" and never were formally designated as an "army." Prior to the campaign, units were dispersed, having spent the winter in garrison and in fortified positions. Regiments had little recent experience operating together as brigades and divisions. Not until Grant crossed the Mississippi and moved into the interior did a major portion of the department assemble as a field army. Not surprisingly, the assembled forces had difficulty even forming up and marching as a unit, let alone fighting. At the battle of Champion Hill, the Confederate army was unresponsive and uncoordinated. Individual brigades and regiments fought hard and well, but higher-level command and control was lacking.

But at the lower echelons, some of the more imaginative and daring tactics of the Vicksburg campaign were executed, or at least attempted, by Confederates. Whereas Grant's forces relied almost exclusively on the frontal attack, on two occasions during the maneuver phase of the campaign, Confederate commanders attempted to attack their enemy in flank. During the battle of Port Gibson, Brigadier General John S. Bowen tried to thwart McClernand's steamroller tactics by leading a portion of Colonel Francis M. Cockrell's brigade in an attack against the Union right flank. But as was so often the case in the Civil War, by the time Cockrell's men reached their jump-off point, the enemy had begun to respond. After initial progress, Cockrell's men were stopped by Union reserves drawn up to oppose them. Later in the campaign, at the battle of Raymond, Confederate Brigadier General John Gregg attempted another flank attack. Unaware that his brigade confronted a Union corps, Gregg detached three of his five regiments and sent them off to attack the Union right. But when the flanking forces reached their jump-off position and realized the numerical odds against them, they opted not to attack.

When the campaign of maneuver ended and the siege of Vicksburg began, an entirely new set of tactics came into play. Whereas there was little formal doctrine for battlefield tactics in the Civil War (and none at all for operational maneuver), the sciences of fortification and siegecraft were well-established and understood by any military engineer trained at West Point. In keeping with the principles of fortification, the Confederates had erected strong earthwork fortifications that afforded interlocking fields of fire and commanded the approaches into Vicksburg. Trenches or "rifle pits" connected the major fortifications. After two failed assaults (by far the bloodiest frontal attacks of the campaign), the Union forces responded with a siege that was also the product of conventional doctrine. Grant established two separate forces, one to face outward and block any Confederate interference from outside, and the other to enclose Vicksburg and "reduce" its fortifications. Union troops crept up to the Confederate positions through zigzag trenches called "saps" or "approaches" and dug mines under some of the major fortifications.

But the siege ended before the last act of the doctrinal script was played out-there was no final assault.

Tactics in the Overland Campaign
By May 1864, Civil War battle tactics  had  evolved  to  the  point that brigades were the basic maneuver units (as opposed to individual regiments). Often, division commanders had some skill at using their brigades in a coordinated fashion, but it was still difficult to bring entire corps into unified action. Thus, both sides fought the tactical battles of the campaign by maneuvering brigades and divisions in combat. However, when conducting operational movements, both sides often moved at corps level with each corps having its own route (or occasionally, two corps following each other on the same route). Tactical battlefield fighting and the operational maneuvering between battles required tremendous coordination and synchronization, which the Civil War command system all too often failed to provide. Further, the terrain in Virginia, while not as rugged as much of the ground in the western theater, contained some heavily wooded areas such as the Wilderness, roads that could alternate between mud and dust, and numerous rivers, all of which made maneuver difficult. Much of the tactical confusion in the campaign's battles resulted from the difficulty of maneuvering large bodies of troops through difficult terrain with a command system that depended mainly on voice commands.

One trend that was common in the Overland Campaign was the tendency of the Union forces to attack in more narrow formations than the Confederate forces. Often, Union brigades advanced with half of their regiments in the front line and half in a second line. The division would in turn have two of its brigades forward with one or two behind. This allowed many Union offensives to bring fresh units into their attacks, but it often prevented the Northerners from using their numbers for an overwhelming initial assault, as their units were committed piecemeal. The Confederate brigades often put all of their regiments on line, which occasionally allowed them to overlap a Union flank. Did these formations reflect evolving doctrinal ideas? Were they responses to the restrictive nature of the terrain? Did commanders choose these methods to improve their ability to control their units? Perhaps the answers lie in the personalities, experiences, and abilities of the commanders on both sides. In any case, as the Overland Campaign wore on, the Confederates were forced to rely on the defense, and in most cases, extensive entrenchments allowed them to deploy regiments on a relatively thin line, with divisions putting two or three brigades forward and one in reserve (as at Cold Harbor).

At the tactical-level and, to a degree the operational-level, certain patterns emerged over the course of the campaign. First, the Confederates were usually short on manpower and were forced to rely more and more on the tactical defense and use of entrenchments. The Southerners launched two very successful attacks in the Wilderness, but for the remainder of the campaign, they generally stayed on the tactical defense. The Union forces were almost constantly on the attack, and they struggled, often in vain, to find a solution to the seemingly impenetrable Confederate defensive positions. Many Union attacks, in particular the tragic assaults at Cold Harbor on 3 June, were costly failures against the Southern defenders. On the other hand, attacks by Upton at Spotsylvania and by Hancock at both the Wilderness and Spotsylvania achieved some measure of success, but could not achieve a decisive victory. In each case, even when the Federals made an initial breakthrough, they found it nearly impossible to maintain enough command and control of their forces to sustain their momentum.

This tactical stalemate forced the Union forces to seek an operational solution to the dominance of the defense. Thus emerged the outstanding operational characteristic of the Overland Campaign—Grant's attempts to maneuver around Lee's flanks and force a battle in a position favorable to the Union. Generally, Grant attempted to turn Lee's right flank, which would place Union forces between Lee and Richmond. In these conditions, the Federals might be able to fight the Confederates in a sort of “meeting engagement” outside of entrenchments, or perhaps even force Lee into attacking the Union troops in their own prepared positions. The major engagements in the campaign resulted from these operational moves, but in almost every case, Lee was able to maneuver his troops into position before the Union forces arrived. In several cases, bad Federal staff work, or just plain bad luck, also hindered the Union moves. In one case—the crossing of the James—the Union forces performed their flanking maneuver superbly and actually “stole a march” on Lee. Yet, bungled Union assaults squandered this success at Petersburg from 15 to 18 June.

In sum, the Overland Campaign was like many other Civil War campaigns in terms of tactics. Attacks were often piecemeal, frontal, and uncoordinated, and they generally failed to dislodge defenders. On the other hand, the lack of a single decisive battle forced both Grant and Lee to think more in terms of a sustained campaign, and the series of their maneuvers and battles fought over the Virginia landscape might even be considered an early example of what modern military theorists call “the operational art.” The balance of two such skillful and determined opponents fighting in the conditions of 1864 was bound to lead to horrific casualties until one side or the other was exhausted.

Logistics
Victory on Civil War battlefields seldom hinged on the quality or quantity of tactical logistics. At the operational and strategic levels, however, logistical capabilities and concerns always shaped the plans and sometimes the outcomes of campaigns. As the war lengthened, the logistical advantage shifted inexorably to the North. The Federals controlled the majority of the financial and industrial resources of the nation. With their ability to import any needed materials, they ultimately created the best‑supplied army the world had yet seen. Despite suffering from shortages of raw materials, the Confederates generated adequate ordnance but faltered gradually in their ability to acquire other war materiel. The food supply for Southern armies was often on the verge of collapse, largely because limitations of the transportation network were compounded by political‑military mismanagement. Still, the state of supply within field armies on both sides depended more on the caliber of the people managing resources than on the constraints of available materiel. In Lee's case, the Army of Northern Virginia managed to scrape by in 1864, although the need for forage and food sometimes forced Lee to disperse units to gather supplies. The situation grew worse throughout the year, but did not become critical until after the loss of the Shenandoah Valley added to the gradual decay of the Army during the siege at Petersburg.

One of the most pressing needs at the start of the war was for sufficient infantry and artillery weapons. With most of the government arsenals and private manufacturing capability located in the North, the Federals ultimately produced sufficient modern firearms for their armies, but the Confederates also accumulated adequate quantities—either from battlefield captures or through the blockade. In addition, exceptional management within the Confederate Ordnance Bureau led to the creation of a series of arsenals throughout the South that produced sufficient quantities of munitions and weapons.

The Northern manufacturing capability could have permitted the Federals eventually to produce and outfit their forces with repeating arms, the best of which had been patented before 1861. Initially, however, the North's conservative Ordnance Bureau would not risk switching to a new, unproven standard weapon that could lead to soldiers wasting huge quantities of ammunition in the midst of an expanding war. By 1864, after the retirement of Chief of Ordnance James Ripley and with President Lincoln's urging, Federal cavalry received seven‑shot Spencer  repeating carbines, which greatly increased battle capabilities.

Both sides initially relied on the states and local districts to provide some equipment, supplies, animals, and foodstuffs. As the war progressed, more centralized control over production and purchasing emerged under both governments. Still, embezzlement and fraud were common problems for both sides throughout the war. The North, with its preponderance of railroads and developed waterways, had ample supply and adequate distribution systems. The South's major supply problem was subsistence. Arguably,  the South produced enough food during the war to provide for both military and civilian needs, but mismanagement, parochial local interests, and the relatively underdeveloped transportation network often created havoc with distribution.

In both armies, the Quartermaster, Ordnance, Subsistence, and Medical Bureaus procured and distributed equipment, food, and supplies. The items for which these bureaus were responsible are similar to the classes of supply used today. Some needs overlapped, such as the Quartermaster Bureau's procurement of wagons for medical ambulances, but conflicts of interest usually were manageable. Department and army commanders requested needed resources directly from the bureaus, and bureau chiefs wielded considerable power as they parceled out occasionally limited resources.
Typically, materiel flowed from the factory to base depots as directed by the responsible bureaus. Supplies were then shipped to advanced depots, generally a city on a major transportation artery safely within the rear area of a department. During campaigns, the armies established temporary advance depots served by rail or river transportation—Grant's forces made particularly heavy use of resupply from the navy in the Overland Campaign. From these points, wagons carried the supplies forward to the field units. This principle is somewhat similar to the modern theater sustainment organization.

The management of this logistics system was complex and crucial. A corps wagon train, if drawn by standard six-mule teams, would be spread out from five to eight miles, based on the difficulty of terrain, weather, and road conditions. The wagons, which were capable of hauling 4,000 pounds in optimal conditions, could carry only half that load in mountainous terrain. Sustenance for the animals was a major restriction, because each animal required up to 26 pounds of hay and grain a day to stay healthy and productive. Bulky and hard to handle, this forage was a major consideration in campaign planning. Wagons delivering supplies more than one day's distance from the depot could be forced to carry excessive amounts of animal forage. If full animal forage was to be carried, the required number of wagons to support a corps increased dramatically with each subsequent day's distance from the forward depot. Another problem was the herds of beef that often accompanied the trains or were appropriated en route. This provided fresh (though tough) meat for the troops, but slowed and complicated movement.

The bulk-supply problems were alleviated somewhat by the practice of foraging, which, in the proper season, supplied much of the food for animals and men on both sides. Foraging was practiced with and without command sanction, wherever an army went, and it became command policy during Ulysses S. Grant's Vicksburg campaign and William T. Sherman's Atlanta campaign. Foraging was less prevalent in the east, especially by 1864, for the simple reason that northeastern Virginia had already been picked clean by three years of war.

Both sides based their supply requirements on pre-war regulations and wartime improvisation.

BUREAU SYSTEM. Bureau chiefs and heads of staff departments were responsible for
various aspects of the Army's administration and logistics and reported directly to the
Secretary of War. The division of responsibility and authority over them among the
Secretary of War, the Assistant Secretaries, and the General in Chief was never spelled out,
and the supply departments functioned independently and without effective coordination
throughout most of the Civil War, although much improved after Grant took command.
Logistical support was entrusted to the heads of four supply departments in
Washington: the Quartermaster General, responsible for clothing and equipment, forage,
animals, transportation, and housing; the Commissary General for rations; the Chief of
Ordnance for weapons, ammunition, and miscellaneous related equipment; and the Surgeon
General for medical supplies, evacuation, treatment, and hospitalization of the wounded.
For other support there were the Adjutant General, the Inspector General, the
Paymaster General, the Judge Advocate General, the Chief of Engineers, and the Chief of
Topographical Engineers.
The military department was the basic organizational unit for administrative and
logistical purposes, and the commander of each department controlled the support in that area
with no intervening level between his departmental headquarters and the bureau chiefs in
Washington. There were six departments when the war started (East, West, Texas, New Mexico, Utah, and Pacific); however, later on, boundaries changed and several geographical
departments might be grouped together as a military "division" headquarters.
Army depots were located in major cities: Boston, New York, Baltimore,
Washington, Cincinnati, Louisville, St. Louis, Chicago, New Orleans, and San Francisco.
Philadelphia was the chief depot and manufacturing center for clothing. Advanced and
temporary supply bases were established as needed to support active operations. Until 1864
most depots were authorized the rank of captain as commander, who despite their low rank
and meager pay, had tremendous resources of men, money, and material under their control.
There were a few exceptions, notably COL Daniel H. Rucker at the Washington QM Depot
and COL George D. Ramsay at the Washington Arsenal. The primary function of the depots
was to procure supplies and prepare them for use in the field by repacking, assembling, or
other similar tasks.
Procurement was decentralized. Purchases were made on the market by low-bid
contract in the major cities and producing areas by depot officers. Flour and some other
commodities were procured closer to the troops when possible. Cattle were contracted for at
specific points, and major beef depots were maintained at Washington (on the grounds of the
unfinished Washington Monument), Alexandria, VA, and Louisville, KY. The
Subsistence Department developed a highly effective system of moving cattle on the hoof to
the immediate rear of the armies in the field, to be slaughtered by brigade butchers and
issued to the troops the day before consumption.
The Confederate Army used a similar system with depots at Richmond, Staunton,
Raleigh, Atlanta, Columbus (GA), Huntsville, Montgomery, Jackson (MS), Little Rock,
Alexandria (LA), and San Antonio.

SUPPLY OPERATIONS. Most unit logistics were accomplished at regimental level. The
regimental QM was normally a line lieutenant designated by the regimental commander. His
duties included submitting requisitions for all QM supplies and transport, accounting for
regimental property including tentage, camp equipment, extra clothing, wagons, forage, and
animals; issuing supplies and managing the regimental trains. The regimental commissary
officer, also designated from the line, requisitioned, accounted for, and issued rations. The
regimental ordnance officer had similar duties regarding arms and ammunition and managed
the movement of the unit ammunition train.
In theory, logistical staff positions above the regiment were filled by a fully qualified
officer of the supply department concerned, However, experienced officers were in
perpetual short supply, and many authorized positions were filled by officers and
noncommissioned officers from line units or left vacant, the duties performed by someone in
addition to their own. This problem existed in both armies, where inexperience and
ignorance of logistical principles and procedures generally reduced levels of support.

The Soldier's Load: About 45 lbs. (Union) - Musket and bayonet (14 lbs.), 60 rounds, 3-8
days rations, canteen, blanket or overcoat, shelter half, ground sheet, mess gear (cup, knife,
fork, spoon, skillet), personal items (sewing kit, razor, letters, Bible, etc.). Confederates
usually had less, about 30 lbs.

Official US Ration: 20 oz. of fresh or salt beef or 12 oz. of pork or bacon, 18 oz. of flour or 20 of corn meal (bread in lieu if possible), 1.6 oz. of rice or .64 oz. of beans or 1.5 oz of dried potatoes, 1.6 oz of coffee or .24 oz. of tea, 2.4 oz. of sugar, .54 oz. of salt, .32 gill of vinegar.

Union Marching Ration: 16 oz. of "hardtack," 12 oz. salt pork or 4 oz. fresh meat, 1 oz.
coffee, 3 oz. sugar, and salt.

Confederate Ration: Basically the same but with slightly more sugar and less meat, coffee, vinegar and salt, and seldom issued in full. For the Army of Northern Virginia usually half of meat issued and coffee available only when captured or exchanged through the lines for
sugar and tobacco. During the Maryland campaign foraging was disappointing, so Confederate soldiers supplemented the issue ration with corn from the fields and fruit from the orchards.

Forage: Each horse required 14 lbs. of hay and 12 of grain per day; mules needed the same
amount of hay and 9 lbs of grain. No other item was so bulky and difficult to transport.

Union Annual Clothing Issue: 2 caps, 1 hat, 2 dress coats, 3 pr. trousers, 3 flannel shirts, 3 flannel drawers, 4 pr. stockings and 4 pr. bootees (high top shoes). Artillerymen and
cavalrymen were issued jackets and boots instead of bootees. Allowance = $42.

Confederate: Officially, the Confederate soldier was almost equally well clothed, but the
QM was seldom able to supply the required items and soldiers wore whatever came to hand,
the home-dyed butternut jackets and trousers being characteristic items. Shortages of shoes
were a constant problem.

Tents: Sibley (tepee) held 20 men feet to center pole; early in war Union introduced the
tente de'Abri (shelter half), used by the French Army, and called "dog" tent by witty soldiers, now pup tent.

Baggage: Enlisted men of both armies were required to carry their own. Union order of
Sep 1862 limited officers to blankets, one small valise or carpet bag and an ordinary mess
kit. Confederate standards allowed generals 80 lbs., field officers 65 lbs., and captains and
subalterns 50 lbs.

Wagons: Union's standard 6-mule Army wagon could haul 4,000 lbs on good roads in the
best of conditions but seldom exceeded 2,000 or with 4 mules 1,800 lbs. at rate of 12-24
miles a day. Confederates often used 4-mule wagon with smaller capacity.

Army of the Potomac authorized wagons as follows:
 corps hq: 4;
 div and bde hq: 3;
 regt of Inf: 6;
 arty bty and cav: 3;

One wagon per regiment was reserved for hospital stores and one for grain for
officers' horses.

The Army of Northern Virginia used 4-mule wagons as follows:
 div hq 3;
 bde hq 2;
 regt hq 1;
 regt's medical stores 1;
 regt's ammunition 1;
 1/100 men per regt for baggage, camp equipment, rations, etc.;

Numbers of supply wagons per 1,000 men:
 Army of the Potomac (1862) - 29;
 Jackson in the Valley (1862) - 7;
 Army of Northern Virginia (1863) - 28;
 Army of the Potomac (1864) - 36;
 Sherman's March to the Sea (1864) - 40;
 Napoleon's standard - 12.5;

Logistics in the Vicksburg Campaign
When Major General Earl Van Dom's cavalry destroyed Grant's advance depot at Holly Springs in December 1862, it wrecked Grant's plan for an overland, railroad-centered attack to support Sherman's Chickasaw Bayou expedition. Although the outcome of that expedition would probably not have been altered, this episode illustrates how closely operational planning relied on a fixed logistical base for overland operations. Grant, in his memoirs, however, credits the Holly Springs raid with providing him the key to a less-conventional strategy. Forced to rely upon foraging and requisition in the surrounding countryside to feed his army in the weeks following Van Dom's raid, Grant came to realize that the Mississippi valley, though relatively under populated, was indeed a rich agricultural area, abounding in beef, hogs, and grain. Thus, Grant credited Van Dom with showing him the solution to his supply dilemma should he choose to operate far from any secure logistical pipeline. War materiel (weapons, ammunition, medical supplies, etc.) would still have to be hauled by wagons, along with some limited food items such as coffee and bread. The countryside, however, could sustain his army with bulky animal forage, meat, and other provisions.

In January 1863, Grant established an impressive logistics system running from his depots at Cairo, Illinois, and Memphis to advance bases established along the levees at Lake Providence, Milliken's Bend, and Young's Point-the latter being just ten river miles from Vicksburg. Supplies, as well as troops, moved down river on a sizeable fleet of army-contracted riverboats. These transports varied considerably in size, but many were capable of carrying 300,000 pounds of supplies—the equivalent of 150 wagonloads. At the end of March, when Grant decided to move his army south of Vicksburg on the Louisiana side of the river, he hoped to have water transport most or all of the way. Union engineers, augmented by details from McClernand's and Sherman's corps, dug a canal at Duckport linking the Mississippi to the network of bayous paralleling the army's route of march. The canal was completed successfully, but falling water levels made it useless before it could do any good. As a last resort, Union logisticians pushed wagon trains along the sixty-three-mile route that McClernand's and McPherson's corps traveled, from Milliken's Bend to Bruinsburg. Some supplies were hauled by wagon from Milliken's Bend to Perkins' Plantation, just below New Carthage. There, they were loaded on riverboats that had run by the Vicksburg batteries, for delivery to the army downstream. About 11 May, over a week after the bulk of the army had crossed to the east bank, Sherman's men completed a new road from Young's Point to Bowers' Landing, across the base of De Soto point. This road shortened the wagon haul to twelve miles-still a two-day haul over the rough roads. From Bower's Landing, steamers carried supplies down the river to the newly won logistical base at Grand Gulf.

The net effect of these efforts was to give Grant two sets of well-stocked advance depots, one below Vicksburg and several just above the city. After Grant moved away from his new base at Grand Gulf, his army had only to reestablish links with the river and its supply problems would essentially disappear. The Confederates knew this, and expected Grant to stay close to the river during his advance toward Vicksburg. Thus, his movement inland came as a surprise.

In his postwar memoirs. Grant stated that he "cut loose" from his supply lines when he pushed inland from Grand Gulf. Many historians have taken those words at face value, asserting that Grant's men relied entirely upon food and forage gathered from the countryside. Grant, however, never cut completely loose from his supply lines, nor did he intend his words to convey that. As his army maneuvered east of the river, a steady stream of wagons carried supplies from Young's Point to Bower's Landing, where the supplies were loaded on steamboats and carried to Grand Gulf. From Grand Gulf, huge wagon trains, escorted by brigades hurrying forward to join the main force, carried supplies to the army. No "line of supply" existed only in the sense that Union troops did not occupy and garrison the supply route. An aggressive Confederate thrust into the area between Grand Gulf and Grant's army might have thwarted the Union campaign-Grant's men could forage for food, but only so long as they moved forward. Moreover, the barns and fields of Mississippi did not provide any ammunition to the foragers. One of the ironies of the campaign is that Pemberton's single offensive action, the attempt to strike south from Edwards toward Dillon's Plantation on 15 May, would probably have led him to Grant's ammunition train. However, heavy rains, confusion, and indecision led instead to the battle at Champion Hill.

During the campaign of maneuver, Grant was well served by his logistical staff in the rear and by the aggressive support of Rear Admiral David Porter. As Grant's army neared Vicksburg, Porter sensed the opportunity to establish a logistic base just north of Vicksburg on the Yazoo River at Johnson's Plantation (the site of Sherman's landing in the abortive Chickasaw Bayou expedition). The Navy's initiative led to supplies being on the ground by 18 May when Grant's army reached the outer works around the city. That, and efficient construction of roads from the plantation by Federal engineers, enabled Grant to fulfill a promise to provide hardtack for his troops by 21 May. At the same time, Porter's gunboats reduced the Warrenton batteries just a few miles below the city and enabled Grant's logisticians to move the lower supply base from Grand Gulf to Warrenton. These two bases cut the overland wagon haul to a maximum of six miles for units manning the siege lines. Thus, as Grant closed on Vicksburg, his supply situation changed dramatically, almost overnight, whereas the Confederates then had to rely almost completely on whatever stores had been placed in the city in advance.

Curiously, the Confederate logistical situation in the Vicksburg campaign was almost uniformly worse than that of the Union forces. The fact that the Confederates were conducting defensive operations within their own territory resulted in as many logistical problems as advantages. The bountiful forage discovered by Grant's troops was generally not available to the Confederate army, due in large part to the farmers' reluctance to part with their produce. In March, Pemberton complained of a shortage of beef, yet one of his staff officers noted an abundance of cattle in the region between Vicksburg and Jackson. Federal surgeons found apothecary shelves in Jackson well stocked with drugs, yet Confederate surgeons were critically short of medical supplies. The explanation, however, is simple: the invading Federals could take what they needed, whereas the defending Confederates could not so easily requisition from their own people.

Thus, the Confederates had to rely upon their established logistical systems and procedures. Confederate logistical doctrine in the Civil War called for armies to supply themselves, as far as possible, from the resources of the area in which they were stationed. There was no shortage of basic supplies in the Vicksburg region. The Mississippi Delta (the area between the Mississippi and Yazoo Rivers) and farmlands to the east produced large quantities of food for man and beast. The transportation net, with the main rail line running from Vicksburg to the major rail nexus at Jackson, and the numerous navigable waterways, offered the Confederates the ability to stockpile or shift supplies quickly. The telegraph network provided communications that could support the management of logistical resources. Depots and manufacturing centers in Jackson. Enterprise, and Columbus, Mississippi, helped support a variety of Confederate needs.

Three major factors, however, limited Pemberton's ability to optimize his logistical support. The first problem was the inefficiency of, and competing priorities between, the Confederate quartermaster and commissary departments. Many of the supplies from Pemberton's area were needed to support other military departments. Even so, the management of these resources was inefficient, and not enough funds were available for local purchase of food. Pemberton also had concerns about his own staff-officials in Richmond had received civilian complaints about Pemberton's Quartermaster. This problem, however vexing, did not prove insurmountable.

The second problem was largely beyond Pemberton's control-Union naval superiority. Prior to the war, most bulk commodities were moved by water. But in the course of the Vicksburg campaign, Porter's gunboats denied the Confederates the use of the Mississippi and its tributaries, thus throwing heavier demands on the overtaxed road and rail transport systems. Even before Grant's army crossed to the east bank of the Mississippi, Pemberton found it difficult to gather and distribute supplies.

The third and greatest problem hampering Confederate logistical efforts was Pemberton's lack of overall vision for the campaign. In the absence of a campaign plan, the Confederate logisticians, like Pemberton himself, could only react to Union initiatives. Supplies could not be positioned to support any particular scheme of maneuver.

After Grant seized and destroyed Jackson, all supplies became critical for Pemberton. With Porter on the Mississippi and with the eastward rail lines interdicted, Pemberton was effectively cut off from any resources beyond the immediate vicinity of his army. Fortunately, his largest supply depots were in Vicksburg, a fact that helps explain Pemberton's reluctance to risk the loss of the city. Rations that could be stretched out for perhaps two full months were stockpiled inside Vicksburg before 18 May. Ordnance officers had managed to gather significant quantities of small arms and ammunition as well. The main shortages in the city after the siege began were artillery, medical supplies, engineer tools, and percussion caps for rifle-muskets. The latter shortage was eased when couriers penetrated the Union siege lines with several hundred thousand caps.

As the siege progressed, the contrast between Union and Confederate logistics became increasingly pronounced. Confederate stockpiles dwindled, rations were cut, and ammunition expenditure curtailed. But the Union forces, situated as they were on North America's greatest transportation artery, received reinforcements and supplies in seemingly limitless quantities. Predictably, Confederate morale deteriorated until Pemberton felt that his troops had lost the ability and will to fight. Finally, logistics played a role in determining the final surrender terms. An important factor influencing Grant's decision to parole the entire Vicksburg garrison of over 29,000 men was the simple fact that the Confederate government, not the Federal army, would then have to deal with transporting and feeding those troops.

Logistics in the Overland Campaign
Logistics played a crucial role in the Overland Campaign in a variety of ways. First, the overall lack of resources for the Southern forces (coupled with manpower shortages) constrained the Confederate options and helped to keep Lee on the defense for most of the campaign. Second, Grant made extensive use of the Federal Navy's dominance of the sea and rivers to skillfully shift his bases to secured ports as he made his flanking moves to the south. In fact, the tempo of Grant's moves was largely determined by the location and availability of his next base. Finally, Lee's forces relied almost totally on the railroads for their supplies, and thus crucial rail nodes like Hanover Junction and Petersburg were critical locations that Lee had to defend and Grant wanted to take.

Looking first at the Northern perspective, supplies for the eastern theater came from all parts of the North across an extensive and effective rail net that eventually funneled to Baltimore and Washington, DC. The supplies then had to be transported from these major ports and railheads to the armies in the field. At the start of the Overland Campaign, Grant's main forces (the Army of the Potomac and the IX Corps) received their logistics support from the port of Alexandria (across the Potomac River from Washington). The Orange and Alexandria railroad connected the Union camps at Brandy Station with the supply base at Alexandria. In their initial move into the Wilderness, the Union forces needed an extensive wagon train to carry the minimum requirements expressed in the supply regulations (see table 4). The army's animals alone needed 477 tons of forage each day. Grant tried to cut back on nonessential items and decreed a rigorous reduction in wagons, but he still ended up with 4,300 wagons and 835 ambulances at the start of the campaign.

After the Battle of the Wilderness, Grant decided to continue to the south in part driven by the desire to cut Lee's army from its rail supply lines: the Richmond, Fredericksburg, and Potomac (coming from Richmond), and the Virginia Central which brought supplies from the Shenandoah. In order to make this move, the Federals shifted their base to Aquia Landing and Belle Plain on the Potomac River. These ports were securely positioned behind the moving Union forces and connected by a short rail line to a forward position at Fredericksburg.

After Spotsylvania, Grant again shifted to the south and southeast, all the time hoping to get astride the railroads that were Lee's lifeline. In particular, the fighting on the North Anna centered on the Federal attempt to seize Hanover Junction where the Virginia Central Railroad met the Richmond, Fredericksburg, and Potomac line. In these moves, first to the North Anna, then further south to Cold Harbor, the Union forces deftly executed two more base changes: first to Port Royal on the Rappahannock River and then to White House on the Pamunkey River (which in turn flows into the York River). There was no rail line from Port Royal to the army, but the distance from the port to the troops was a relatively short wagon haul for the trains. At White House, the same base used by McClellan in the Peninsula Campaign in 1862, the Union forces could use the Richmond and York River Railroad to bring supplies from the port closer to the front lines at Cold Harbor.

Grant's final move in the campaign brought him to Petersburg, south of the James River. This final flanking movement was clearly aimed at the five rail lines that converged at Petersburg. For this final move, he had the advantage of shifting his base to City Point, a port on the James that was already in Union hands and had been supporting Butler's Army of the James in the Bermuda Hundred Campaign. During the siege at Petersburg, City Point would become one of the busiest ports in the world—a testimony to the ample resources and logistical might of the North.

In sum, even if Grant's central objective was Lee's army, his geographic goals were shaped by the Southerners’ own rail supply lines. At the same time, he made good use of sea lines of communications to keep his own forces well supplied and skillfully shifted his base with each new flanking movement.

On the Southern side, Lee's logistical problems were at once simpler in concept but more difficult in execution. Lee's resupply system was relatively straightforward. The Army of Northern Virginia received a large amount of foodstuffs and forage from the Shenandoah Valley. Most of these supplies came via the Virginia  Central  Railroad. The remainder of his supplies came from the Deep South along several rail lines that converged at Petersburg. Then the supplies moved from Petersburg, through Richmond and Hanover Junction to Lee's army in the field on the Richmond, Fredericksburg, and Potomac Railroad. Lee did not have to worry about shifting bases; he simply needed to protect these rail lines to keep his army supplied.

The difficulty for Lee was that the South was constantly strapped for resources, and the Army of Northern Virginia received just enough supplies to keep up its operations. Occasionally this affected Lee's planning, as when he was forced to keep a large part of his cavalry dispersed prior to the Wilderness to gather forage. Also, the Confederate commander's logistical weaknesses, when added to his manpower shortages, may have discouraged him from taking a more offensive approach after the Wilderness. On the other hand, while the Confederates never enjoyed the logistical plenty of their Union counterparts, Lee's army was never faced with starvation or a shortage of arms and ammunition during the Overland Campaign.

Engineers
Engineers on both sides performed many tasks essential to every campaign. Engineers trained at West Point were at a premium; thus, many civil engineers, commissioned as volunteers, supplemented the work being done by engineer officers. The Confederates, in particular, relied on civilian expertise because many of their trained engineer officers sought line duties. State or even local civil engineers planned and supervised much of the work done on local fortifications.

In the prewar US Army, the Corps of Engineers contained a handful of staff officers and one company of trained engineer troops. This cadre expanded to a four-company Regular engineer battalion. Congress also created a single company of topographic engineers, which joined the Regular battalion when the engineer bureaus merged in 1863. In addition, several volunteer pioneer regiments, some containing up to 2,000 men, supported the various field armies. The Confederate Corps of Engineers, formed as a small staff and one company of sappers, miners, and pontoniers in 1861, grew more slowly and generally relied on details and contract labor rather than established units with trained engineers and craftsmen.

Engineer missions for both sides included construction of fortifications; repair and construction of roads, bridges, and, in some cases, railroads; demolition; limited construction of obstacles; and construction or reduction of siege works. The Federal Topographic Engineers, a separate prewar bureau, performed reconnaissance and produced maps. The Confederates, however, never separated these functions in creating their Corps of Engineers. Experience during the first year of the war convinced the Federals that all engineer functions should be merged under a single corps because qualified engineer officers tended to perform all related functions. As a result, the Federals also merged the Topographic Engineers into their Corps of Engineers in March 1863.
Bridging assets included wagon-mounted pontoon trains that carried either wooden or canvas-covered pontoon boats. Using this equipment, trained engineer troops could bridge even large rivers in a matter of hours. The most remarkable pontoon bridge of the war was the 2,200-foot-long bridge built by the Army of the Potomac engineers in 1864 over the James River at the culmination of the Overland Campaign. It was one of over three dozen pontoon bridges built in support of campaigns in the east that year. In 1862, the Confederates began developing pontoon trains after they had observed their effectiveness.
Both sides in every campaign of the war traveled over roads and bridges built or repaired by their engineers. Federal engineers also helped clear waterways by dredging, removing trees, or digging canals. Fixed fortifications laid out under engineer supervision played critical roles in the Vicksburg campaign and in actions around Richmond and Petersburg. Engineers also supervised the siege works attempting to reduce those fortifications.
While the Federal engineer effort expanded in both men and materiel as the war progressed, the Confederate efforts continued to be hampered by major problems. The relatively small number of organized engineer units available forced Confederate engineers to rely heavily on details or contract labor. Finding adequate manpower, however, was often difficult because of competing demands for it. Local slave owners were reluctant to provide labor details when slave labor was crucial to their economic survival. Despite congressional authorization to conscript 20,000 slaves as a labor force, state and local opposition continually hindered efforts to draft slave labor. Another related problem concerned the value of Confederate currency. Engineer efforts required huge sums for men and materiel, yet initial authorizations were small, and although congressional appropriations grew later in the war, inflation greatly reduced effective purchasing power. A final problem was the simple shortage of iron resources, which severely limited the Confederates’ ability to increase railroad mileage or even produce iron tools.
In 1861, maps for both sides were also in short supply; for many areas in the interior, maps were nonexistent. As the war progressed, the Federals developed a highly sophisticated mapping capability. Federal topographic engineers performed personal reconnaissance to develop base maps, reproduce them by several processes, and distribute them to field commanders. Photography, lithographic presses, and eventually photochemical processes gave the Federals the ability to reproduce maps quickly. Western armies, which usually operated far from base cities, carried equipment in their army headquarters to reproduce maps during campaigns. By 1864, annual map production exceeded 21,000 copies. Confederate topographic work never approached the Federal effort in quantity. Confederate topographers initially used tracing paper to reproduce maps. Not until 1864 did the use of photographic methods become widespread in the South. However, the South had a large advantage in the quality of its maps in the eastern theater in the 1864 campaign. In particular, the Confederates were fighting on their own terrain (Virginia) where many officers knew the ground. In addition, prior to the war, Virginia had produced county maps of the state that proved to be a great advantage for Lee's army.

Engineers in the Vicksburg Campaign
The engineering operations conducted in support of the Vicksburg campaign were perhaps the most diverse and complex of the war. For much of the campaign, Federal engineers focused on mobility operations, while Confederate engineers emphasized countermobility, particularly in denying the Federals the use of streams and bayous in the swamps north of the city. Confederate engineers also supervised the construction and repair of the fortifications around the city. During the siege phase of the campaign, Grant's engineers focused on the reduction of those works, utilizing procedures such as sapping, mining, and other related tasks, as well as the improvement of roads and landings to enhance logistical support. This wide range of activities, which required engineers on both sides to construct roads, emplace or construct bridges, clear or obstruct waterways, construct field works, emplace batteries, divert the flow of rivers, and numerous other tasks, is made even more remarkable by the limited numbers of trained engineers available to accomplish them.

Grant's Army of the Tennessee contained three formally organized engineer units. The largest was the Missouri Engineer Regiment of the West. Organized initially in July 1861, its ranks held skilled railroad men, engineers, and ironworkers recruited from St. Louis and surrounding areas. By the time of the Vicksburg campaign, it had extensive experience in a variety of construction operations and had been involved in some minor skirmishing. The regiment, with a strength of roughly 900 men, constructed roads around Young's Point in February 1863 and in March cut levees on the west side of the river and constructed casemated battery positions opposite Vicksburg. In April, six companies of the regiment returned to Memphis to begin the repair of the Memphis and Charleston Railroad. Companies A, D, F, and I, which were designated the 2d Battalion, remained with Grant's main force during the decisive phases of the campaign. The other two formally organized engineer units were the Kentucky Company of Engineers and Mechanics and Company I of the 35th Missouri, which was designated as the army's pontoon company. Since Grant then had barely 500 "trained" engineers at his disposal for his operations below Vicksburg, most of his divisions detailed men for engineer tasks or designated one of their infantry companies as engineer troops. Known as "pioneer" companies and detachments, or as the "pioneer corps" of their parent divisions, these ad hoc units generally undertook missions requiring higher degrees of skill than those assigned to normal labor details.

The most strenuous engineer labors of the campaign took place between January and April 1863, as Grant sought ways to bypass the strong Confederate position at Vicksburg by creating flanking routes through the bayou country. Several of these efforts involved alternate water routes around the city. One scheme involved digging a canal that would divert the Mississippi through the peninsula directly opposite Vicksburg, a project initiated during Farragut's expedition in June 1862. Beginning in January 1863, details of infantry under engineer supervision labored the better part of two months before the rising river flooded them out. A month later, labor details working under engineer supervision cut the levee at Yazoo Pass to divert Mississippi River water into the Delta region in hopes that gunboats and transports could find a way to Vicksburg from the north. In March, the 1st Missouri Engineers used black powder to blow a gap in the western levee along the Mississippi River at Lake Providence. The plan was to flood enough of the countryside to link the bayous and rivers west of the Mississippi and thus provide an alternate route for steamboats all the way to the Red River. Once the levees were broken, the engineers used man-powered underwater saws, which swung pendulum-like from barge-mounted trestles, to cut off trees and stumps and allow passage of vessels. This backbreaking work required the men to spend much of their time in the water untangling the saws. It took the Missouri Engineers eight days to clear a two-mile stretch of bayou. Unfortunately, falling water levels led to the abandonment of the project.

Grant's subsequent march from Milliken's Bend to Hard Times, a distance of sixty-three miles through the swampy floodplain, entailed a vast amount of engineering work. Much of the roadbed had to be corduroyed (paved with logs laid side-by-side); stretches of quicksand required layers of planking to create sufficient buoyancy for wagons; and numerous water courses had to be bridged using materials found on site. Engineers and infantry details constructed eight major bridges, totaling more than 1,700 feet, along the road to Hard Times. Again, the shortage of qualified engineer troops meant that most of the actual labor involved details of infantry, under the supervision of engineer-trained officers. This road-building effort continued on the west bank even after Grant crossed the river at Bruinsburg and pushed inland.

During the campaign of maneuver on the east side of the river, Union bridge builders demonstrated their ingenuity to the fullest. Twenty-two trestle, suspension, pontoon, and raft bridges were employed in the campaign. Engineers used all available materials in their bridges, including boards pulled from buildings, cotton bales, telegraph wire, vines, cane, and flatboats, in addition to the supplies forwarded from engineer depots upriver. The pontoon company of Sherman's corps ultimately brought along its inflatable rubber pontoons, which were employed in the crossing of the Big Black River.

Once Grant decided to initiate a formal siege to reduce Vicksburg, he was faced with a critical shortage of trained engineer officers. Grant ordered all officers with West Point training or civil engineer experience to assist chief engineer Captain Frederick E. Prime and the other three engineer officers on Grant's staff. These men supervised infantry details at the different approaches, while the trained engineer units worked in the saps and trenches. Captain Andrew Hickenlooper, Major General John A. Logan's chief engineer, was able to procure experienced coal miners, drawn from the ranks, to construct the mine undertaken by Logan's division.

On the Confederate side, the engineering effort in this campaign came under the general authority of chief engineer Major Samuel H. Lockett, who arrived at Vicksburg in June 1862. At that time, Vicksburg's only fortifications consisted of a few batteries along the river. Union naval bombardments on 27–28 July 1862 persuaded the Confederate command to fortify the city on both the landward and riverfronts. Lockett spent the month of August surveying the rough terrain and planning on how best to utilize it for defensive purposes. On 1 September 1862, the actual construction began, using hired or impressed slave labor. Lockett's fortified line extended nine miles, from the river above Vicksburg to the river below. Thirteen river batteries studded the bluffs overlooking the Mississippi. Snyder's (Haynes') Bluff to the north and Warrenton to the south were also fortified. In addition, the Confederates also constructed a set of floating barriers called "rafts" across the Yazoo River to block incursions by Union gunboats.

When Pemberton assumed command of the department on 1 November 1862, Lockett's responsibilities increased. He exercised authority over the entire area from Holly Springs to Port Hudson and from Vicksburg to Jackson. As part of his duties, Lockett surveyed defensive positions around Jackson and Edwards Station. In May 1863, after Grant had crossed the river, Lockett laid out defensive bridgeheads at several crossing sites along the Big Black River.

One other Confederate engineering effort is worthy of note. Brigadier General John S. Bowen, given command of Grand Gulf in March 1863, used slave labor to shave the cliffs overlooking the mouth of the Big Black River and built a series of batteries and rifle pits that would withstand over one hundred tons of ordnance fired by Porter's gunboats during their unsuccessful bombardment of the position on 29 April.

As the campaign unfolded, Lockett continued to support the Confederate army, often on his own initiative. It was Lockett who found and repaired the washed-out bridge over Baker's Creek that gave Pemberton a withdrawal route after the battle of Champion Hill on 16 May. Lockett later prepared the railroad bridge over the Big Black for demolition and fired it on 17 May just before the Federals reached it after their destruction of the Confederate bridgehead. Following that disastrous engagement, Lockett rushed back to Vicksburg to supervise the repair of fortifications damaged by the winter rains. Once the siege began, Lockett was busy supervising the repair of fortifications damaged by Union artillery. When the Federals began mining efforts, Lockett responded with at least fifteen countermines, three of which he exploded.

Lockett operated with even fewer engineer assets than the meager number available to Grant. Although Lockett and his three-man staff equaled the number of engineers assigned to Grant's staff, and although he did have four other trained engineers as assistants, his troop assets included only one company of sappers and miners that numbered less than three dozen men. Most of the entrenching work had been done by a relatively small number of hired or impressed slave laborers. Apparently, Confederate infantrymen were less willing than their Union counterparts to dig and maintain earthworks. When Lockett reached Vicksburg on 18 May, he had only twenty-six sappers and miners, eight detailed mechanics, four overseers, and seventy-two slaves (twenty of whom were sick) to quickly repair nine miles of fortified lines. Lockett noted having only 500 shovels available.

Although the Confederate army at Vicksburg was obviously blessed with an engineer staff officer of talent and initiative, not all of Lockett's countrymen appreciated his efforts. General Joseph E. Johnston, when he toured the works around Vicksburg in December 1862, felt that "[the usual error of Confederate engineering had been committed there. An immense, entrenched camp, requiring an army to hold it, had been made instead of a fort requiring only a small garrison." This defect, however, was not Lockett's fault. He received little command guidance; therefore, he planned his defenses to suit the best engineering aspects of the terrain.

Topographical engineering played little role in this campaign for either side. Grant's topographic engineers became fully involved in the more crucial field engineering missions, and the speed of movements in May precluded useful mapping work. The Confederates, as was typical in most of the western theater, paid almost no attention to mapping or even detailed reconnaissance of their area of operations. As a result. Pemberton did not know the topography of his own department any better than Grant did during the campaign of maneuver.

Engineers in the Overland Campaign
Engineers on both sides played a significant role in several of the engagements of the Overland Campaign. In the Wilderness, Lee's chief engineer, Major General Martin L. Smith, conducted a reconnaissance that discovered an unfinished railroad bed on the open Union left flank on 6 May. He also plotted the route for the path cut by the Confederates for Major General Richard H. Anderson's move to Spotsylvania. On a less positive note, Smith also laid out the trace of the vulnerable Mule Shoe line at Spotsylvania (although, in Smith's defense, he did urge the heavy use of artillery to reinforce the exposed position). Note that engineers on both sides usually laid out the trace of field fortifications, but the infantry had to do the actual construction.
On the Union side, their engineer's role in the tactical battles was sometimes less beneficial. On several occasions—for example, Barlow's night march for the attack on the Mule Shoe at Spotsylvania and the II Corps move on the night of 1 June at Cold Harbor—guides were totally inadequate for the task. They were usually totally ignorant of the ground and even led Union units down incorrect routes. It did not help that Meade's staff engineers often provided the guides and corps commanders with poor maps (or none at all).
On the other hand, the Federal engineers performed essential missions in upgrading roads, railroads, and supply depots, as well as bridging numerous rivers to include the magnificent pontoon bridge on the James River. The Federal rail system in occupied Virginia, which had been superbly organized by Brigadier General Herman Haupt in 1862–63, was a model of successful improvisation. The Confederates did not have the extensive resources of their Northern opponents, and usually, being on the defense, they did not construct as many railroads and bridges. However, the Southerners became masters at restoring broken rail lines after Union raids; for example, they repaired the Virginia Central to full operations within two weeks after Sheridan's raid in May.

Communications
Communications systems used during the Civil War consisted of line-of-sight signaling, telegraphic systems, and various forms of the time-honored courier methods. The telegraph mainly offered viable strategic and operational communications, line-of-sight signaling provided operational and limited tactical possibilities, and couriers were most heavily used for tactical communications.

The Federal Signal Corps was in its infancy during the Civil War.  Major Albert J. Myer was appointed the first signal chief in 1860; his organization grew slowly and became officially recognized as the Signal Corps in March 1863 and achieved bureau status by November of that year. Throughout the war, the Signal Corps remained small—its maximum strength reaching just 1,500 officers and men, most of whom were on detached service with the corps. Myer also indirectly influenced the formation of the Confederate Signal Service. Among the men who assisted Myer in his prewar testing of his wigwag signaling system (Myer's wigwag system, patented in 1858, used five separate numbered movements of a single flag) was Lieutenant E.P. Alexander. Alexander used wigwag signals to the Confederates’ advantage during the First Battle of Bull Run and later organized the Confederate Signal Corps. Officially established in April 1862, the Confederate Signal Corps was attached to the Adjutant and Inspector General Department. It attained the same size as its Federal counterpart, with nearly 1,500 men ultimately being detailed for service.

Myer also fought hard to develop a Federal field telegraph service. This field service utilized the Beardslee device, a magneto‑powered machine operated by turning a wheel to a specific point, which sent an electrical impulse that keyed the machine at the other end to the same letter. Although less reliable than the standard Morse code telegraph key, the Beardslee could be used by an operator with only several hours’ training and did not require bulky batteries for a power source. Myer's field telegraph units carried equipment on wagons that enabled its operators to establish lines between field headquarters. The insulated wire used could also be hooked into existing trunk lines, thus offering the potential to extend the reach of the civilian telegraph network. Control over the existing fixed telegraph system, however, remained with the US Military Telegraph Service. Myer lost his struggle to keep the field telegraph service under the Signal Corps when Secretary of War Edwin M. Stanton relieved Myer as the signal chief in November 1863 and placed all telegraph activity under  the Military Telegraph Service.

Although the Confederate Signal Corps’ visual communications capabilities were roughly equal to that of the Federals,  Confederate field telegraph operations remained too limited to be of operational significance. The Confederates’ existing telegraph lines provided strategic communications capabilities similar to those of the Federals, but the lack of resources and factories in the South for producing wire precluded their extending the prewar telegraph networks.
The courier system, using mounted staff officers or detailed soldiers to deliver orders and messages, was the most viable tactical communications option short of commanders meeting face to face. Although often effective, this system was fraught with difficulties, as couriers were captured, killed, or delayed en route to their destinations; commanders misinterpreted or ignored messages; and situations changed by the time a message was delivered. The weaknesses of the courier system, though often not critical, did tend to compound other errors or misjudgments during campaigns.

Communications in the Vicksburg Campaign
Operating along river lines of communication meant that Grant's army often would leave behind its excellent strategic telegraph network. Memphis, two days by steamboat from Vicksburg, was the nearest telegraph station upriver, and the telegraph lines running north from Memphis often were cut by guerrillas. For much of the campaign, Cairo, Illinois, was the closest point that had reliable telegraph links with the East. Once Grant began operations south of Vicksburg, he essentially broke off his communications with Washington. President Lincoln, on 22 May 1863 (the day Grant launched his deliberate assault against Vicksburg), telegraphed Major General Stephen Hurlbutt at Memphis with a situation update based upon information gleaned from Confederate newspapers smuggled out of Richmond. The next day, Lincoln, who had not yet heard from Grant about his landing at Bruinsburg, finally received a telegraphic report. Grant's message, describing his operations since 30 April, had been sent upriver by courier on a steamer only after the Federal army had closed on the city on 18 May.

As for Federal tactical communications, Grant's signal corps detachment struggled to fill its ranks with detailed officers and men, but the full complement of forty-five officers was not assigned until late in the campaign. Signal officers operating with the field army probably provided their best service as scouts, since they usually advanced ahead of the main force, reconnoitering potential signal sites. The nature of the terrain generally precluded communications by flag, but stations set up along the riverbanks and at key areas along the line of march offered some limited local communications. Admiral Porter early saw the value of the army signal system. He detailed seven Navy officers to work with the signal corps. Thus Porter, on the river, could maintain a link with the army as long as the gunboats operated within visual range of army signal stations on shore.

Telegraph played no tactical role in the Vicksburg campaign. Although six field telegraph units were assigned to Grant's army, they did not arrive in Memphis until late June and did not reach Vicksburg until after the surrender. During the campaign of maneuver, Grant's most reliable means of tactical communication was the courier, and this method was fraught with problems. On 16 May, as the Federal army advanced on multiple routes toward Champion Hill, the courier system failed badly. When the northernmost of the three Union columns became fully engaged with the enemy, Grant, accompanying that column, sent a message to McClernand, three miles away, to bring the other two columns into action. But the courier carrying the message chose to take a twelve-mile route by road rather than riding three miles across country. As a result, four hours elapsed before McClernand's divisions pushed the enemy, and part of his force never attacked at all. Another problem arose during the deliberate assault of the Vicksburg works on 22 May, when Grant's inability to communicate directly with McClernand led to confusion about the need to support a supposed success in McClernand's sector.

The Confederates, on the other hand, operated with an excellent network of fixed telegraphic communications until Grant cut the lines into Vicksburg as he advanced from the south and east. The existence of a civilian telegraph net allowed Pemberton to get by with a signal corps detachment of only three officers. Virtually every significant town was linked by telegraph line; thus, Pemberton initially had excellent operational as well as strategic communications. In December 1862, Confederate telegraphers, using a line running along the west bank of the Mississippi, alerted Pemberton to the approach of Sherman's Chickasaw Bayou expedition, enabling the Confederates to bring in reinforcements from other parts of the department.

Ironically, the effectiveness of his telegraph communications may have worked to Pemberton's disadvantage as the campaign progressed because the telegraph system also allowed him to receive contradictory advice from two key subordinates, Bowen and Stevenson. Bowen argued that the main Federal effort was coming from below Vicksburg, while Stevenson argued that it was coming above Vicksburg. The telegraph also provided Pemberton with conflicting instructions from Joseph Johnston and Jefferson Davis about whether he should defend or evacuate Vicksburg as Grant advanced on the city. Most important, the allure of the telegraph may well have been a factor in keeping Pemberton tied to his headquarters long after he should have taken the field in person.

After 4 May, when advancing Federals began to cut telegraph wires, the Confederates relied increasingly on couriers. This system also had its problems. One of the three couriers Johnston sent out on 13 May with an order directing Pemberton to join him at Clinton was actually a Federal spy, who instead delivered the message to the Federals. Thus Grant learned of the order before the other two couriers reached Pemberton!

Once Pemberton withdrew behind the works at Vicksburg, couriers became his only means of communication with the outside world. Although a few men were able to slip through Federal lines early in the siege, couriers ultimately were forced to use the river, clinging to floating logs or pieces of debris in order to enter and leave the city. Messages conveyed by this dangerous route took from five to ten days to pass between Johnston and Pemberton, and often couriers destroyed their messages if capture seemed imminent. The last message Pemberton received from outside the city came in by courier on 23 June.

Communications in the Overland Campaign
On the Northern side, Grant had almost constant telegraphic communication with Halleck in Washington, which gave him a relatively good measure of strategic control over Union armies in other theaters of the war. Within the eastern theater, Grant could communicate with Sigel in the Valley and Butler on the Virginia Peninsula via his telegraph connections to Washington.

Grant's communications with the Army of the Potomac and the initially separate IX Corps were affected more by the awkward Union command relationship than the technical means of communication. For the most part, Grant and Meade both relied heavily on couriers with some flag signaling. Initially, Grant, with his small staff and few aides, attempted to issue only broad orders to Meade and allow the army commander to execute tactical control. At the same time, Grant had to issue orders directly to the IX Corps (at least until late May) to coordinate Burnside's moves with the Army of the Potomac. On several occasions, Grant bypassed Meade and confusing or duplicate orders resulted.
Lee also relied heavily on couriers at the tactical level, and his streamlined command structure minimized confusion over orders.  Lee did use flag signals, especially at the beginning of the campaign at Clark's Mountain. The Union forces occasionally intercepted these signals, but they gained only a minor advantage from this. At a higher level, Lee had solid telegraph contact with his political leadership in Richmond. Indirectly, through the capital, he remained in contact with Breckinridge in the Valley and Beauregard in North Carolina (and later at Bermuda Hundred and Petersburg).

Medical support

Federal and Confederate medical systems followed a similar pattern. Surgeons general and medical directors for both sides had served many years in the prewar Medical Department, but were hindered by an initial lack of administrative experience in handling large numbers of casualties (see table 5), as well as the state of medical science in the mid‑19th century. Administrative procedures improved with experience, but throughout the war the simple lack of knowledge about the true causes of disease and infection led to many more deaths than direct battlefield action.

After the disaster at the Battle of First Bull Run, the Federal Medical Department established an evacuation and treatment system developed by Surgeon Jonathan Letterman. At the heart of the system were three precepts: consolidation of field hospitals at division level, decentralization of medical supplies down to regimental level, and centralization of medical control of ambulances at all levels. A battle casualty evacuated from the front line normally received treatment at a regimental holding area immediately to the rear. From this point, wagons or ambulances carried wounded men to a division field hospital, normally within a mile of the battle lines. Seriously wounded men could then be further evacuated by wagon, rail, or watercraft to general hospitals located usually in towns along lines of communication in the armies’ rear areas.

Although the Confederate system followed the same general principles, their field hospitals were often consolidated at brigade rather than division level. A second difference lay in the established span of control of medical activities. Unlike their Federal counterparts who had control over all medical activities within an army area, a Confederate army medical director had no control of activities beyond his own brigade or division field hospitals. A separate medical director for general hospitals was responsible for evacuation and control. In practice, both sets of medical directors resolved potential problems through close cooperation. By 1863, the Confederacy had also introduced rear area “wayside hospitals,” which were intended to handle convalescents en route home on furloughs.

Procedures, medical techniques, and medical problems for both sides were virtually identical. Commanders discouraged soldiers from leaving the battle lines to escort wounded back to the rear, but such practice was common, especially in less-disciplined units. The established technique for casualty evacuation was to detail men for litter and ambulance duty. Both armies used bandsmen, among others, for this task. Casualties would move or be assisted back from the battle line, where litter bearers evacuated them to field hospitals using ambulances or supply wagons. Ambulances were specially designed two or four-wheel carts with springs to limit jolts, but rough roads made even short trips agonizing for wounded men. Brigade and division surgeons staffed consolidated field hospitals. Hospital site considerations were the availability of water, potential buildings to supplement the hospital tents, and security from enemy cannon and rifle fire. The majority of operations performed at field hospitals in the aftermath of battle were amputations. Approximately 70 percent of Civil War wounds occurred in the extremities, and the soft lead Minié ball shattered any bones it hit. Amputation was the best technique then available to limit the chance of serious infection. The Federals were generally well supplied with chloroform, morphine, and other drugs, though shortages did occur on the battlefield. Confederate surgeons were often short of critical drugs and medical supplies.

Medical support in the Vicksburg Campaign
Grant's Army of the Tennessee had adopted most of the Letterman system by March 1863. Thus, field hospitals were consolidated at the division echelon, and medical supplies were distributed down to regimental level. Ambulances were under positive medical control, with commissioned or noncommissioned officers in charge at division and brigade and ambulance drivers and assistants assigned to each regiment. When Regular army surgeon Madison Mills became Grant's medical director in March 1863, he inherited a growing field hospital established at Milliken's Bend. Mills established convalescent camps and opened more field hospitals there to support Grant's guidance that ill troops be kept with the command insofar as possible to enable them to rejoin their units upon recovery.

Federal surgeons were able to stockpile a significant amount of medical supplies in the depot established at Young's Point. Most were kept on the steamer Des Arc, which could move supplies to any secure drop-off point along the river. By May, Mills estimated that six months of medical supplies had been stockpiled. He was assisted in this by Grant's standing order that any steamer with space that moved down river from Memphis was to bring additional medical supplies. The medical department also received invaluable assistance from the U.S. Sanitary Commission in the form of supplies and evacuation of sick and wounded.

The river constituted an excellent evacuation as well as supply route. In addition to the 1,000-bed general hospital and convalescent camps established just north of Vicksburg, thousands of beds were available in general hospitals up river. Memphis alone had 5,000 available beds, with many more available in general hospitals in Cairo, Mound City, Paducah, Evansville, and St. Louis. Three steamers, R. C. Wood, D. A. January, and City of Memphis, served as hospital ships for evacuation to these upriver hospitals. A round trip to Memphis took four to five days.

The most severe medical problem facing Grant's army between January and July 1863 was disease, a problem severely exacerbated early in the campaign when the army occupied swampy encampments along the river. From January to March, high water forced the troops to crowd together on the tops of the levees. Unfortunately, the levees also served as roads, latrines, and graves. Thus, Grant's army experienced over 170,000 cases of serious illness during this encampment. One should be skeptical of historians' assertions that work on projects such as the canal helped put Grant's men in excellent shape for the campaigning to come. Reports from regiments engaged in these projects routinely list more men on the sick lists than were present for duty. Once Grant began to maneuver, however, the combination of continual movement and healthier terrain led to dramatic decreases in serious disease.

During the campaign of maneuver, surgeons were forced by the nature of operations to carry sick and wounded soldiers along with the marching columns or leave them behind to be captured. By the time Grant began the siege of Vicksburg, over 2,000 Federal wounded from the battles of Raymond, Jackson, and Champion Hill had been left under Confederate control. Nineteen Federal surgeons stayed behind to attend these men. Four additional Federal surgeons stayed to help attend the Confederate wounded from those battles, which indicates the critical shortage of doctors serving Pemberton's army. On 20 May, five wagons displaying a flag of truce and loaded with medical supplies rolled east from the Federal siege lines into Confederate territory to support the wounded from those earlier battles. After the surrender of Vicksburg on 4 July, fifty ambulances moved to Raymond under a flag of truce to recover many of these wounded.

Although the Federal corps commanders' emphasis on medical support varied, medical officers had adequate supplies throughout the campaign. Sherman's corps allocated enough wagons for medical needs. McClernand, on the other hand, accorded low priority to medical requirements, thus Surgeon Mills had to scramble to support his XIII Corps surgeons. Shortages of medical supplies were partly made up in Jackson and other towns as surgeons raided the stocks of local drug stores. There also seemed to be no shortage of food for the wounded. Surgeons reported an abundance of beef for making soup and an adequate supply of hard bread and vegetables. After the supply line to the river was fully reestablished on 21 May, even ice became available.

After Grant initiated the siege of Vicksburg, division hospitals were established a mile behind the lines, using combinations of buildings and tents. Water often came from cisterns because of a shortage of wells and springs. The policy of keeping wounded and sick soldiers close to their commands, whenever practicable, was maintained. A consolidated evacuation hospital near Johnson's plantation on the Yazoo River housed the seriously ill and wounded until medical steamers could move them up the Mississippi to general hospitals.

Except for the assaults of 19 and 22 May, when more than 3,000 Union soldiers were wounded, battle casualties averaged close to a hundred per week, numbers that the medical staffs could manage effectively. Upon the Confederate surrender on 4 July, however, the Federal surgeons were confronted with over 6,000 Confederate sick and wounded from the city. The well-established Federal hospital, supply, and evacuation network proved adequate to meet this new demand.

Relatively little specific information is available concerning Confederate medical efforts during the campaign. However, it is safe to assume that problems with sickness and disease, particularly for those units posted in the Delta, were of similar magnitude to those encountered by Union troops when they, too, camped on the floodplain. It is clear that the Confederate army suffered from supply shortages and from an inadequate number of trained surgeons. Since Federal surgeons reported finding large stocks of medical supplies in Jackson, it would seem that some of Pemberton's logistical problems hindered his medical staff as well. Reports on the medical condition of the army at the time of the surrender reveal that, within the city, the Confederates were "almost destitute" of medical supplies.

Medical support in the Overland Campaign
By 1864, almost all Union forces generally conformed to the Letterman medical system. The Federals had long established considerable hospitals in the Washington area, and their command of the sea greatly aided in evacuation to these facilities. Even so, the unprecedented number of sustained casualties in May and the first half of June put considerable strain on the Union efforts. After the bloody fights at the Wilderness and Spotsylvania, the Federals established an extensive field hospital and evacuation center at Fredericksburg, probably the largest of its kind in the war.
The Confederates were able to take advantage of protected rail lines to evacuate most of their casualties to Richmond. Their bigger problem was a lack of trained surgeons and medical supplies. The Southern medical facilities were meager compared to their Union counterparts and barely adequate for needs of the campaign.

See also

 List of American Civil War battles
 Union Army
 Confederate States Army
 Cavalry in the American Civil War
 Cavalry Corps, Army of Northern Virginia
 Cavalry Corps (Union Army)
 Field artillery in the American Civil War
 Siege artillery in the American Civil War
 Bibliography of the American Civil War
 Bibliography of Abraham Lincoln
 Bibliography of Ulysses S. Grant
 Signal Corps
 Balloon Corps

Notes

References
 Ballard, Ted, and Billy Arthur. Chancellorsville Staff Ride: Briefing Book. Washington, DC: United States Army Center of Military History, 2002. . 
 Ballard, Ted. Battle of Antietam: Staff Ride Guide. Washington, DC: United States Army Center of Military History, 2006. . 
 Gabel, Christopher R., Staff ride handbook for the Vicksburg Campaign, December 1862-July 1863.  Fort Leavenworth, Kan.: Combat Studies Institute Press, 2001. . 
 King, Curtis S., William G. Robertson, and Steven E. Clay. Staff Ride Handbook for the Overland Campaign, Virginia, 4 May to 15 June 1864: A Study on Operational-Level Command.. Fort Leavenworth, Kan.: Combat Studies Institute Press, 2006. .

External links
 Civil War Field Fortifications Web Site
 Civil War Artillery Projectiles
 The Civil War Artillery Compendium
 CivilWarArtillery.com
 Profiles of Civil War Field Artillery
 The Danville Artillery Confederate Reenactor Website
 The 1841 Mountain Howitzer

Union Army
Confederate States Army